The Joint Comprehensive Plan of Action (JCPOA;  (BARJAM)), commonly known as the Iran nuclear deal or Iran deal, is an agreement on the Iranian nuclear program reached in Vienna on 14 July 2015, between Iran and the P5+1 (the five permanent members of the United Nations Security Council—China, France, Russia, United Kingdom, United States—plus Germany) together with the European Union.

Formal negotiations toward JCPOA began with the adoption of the Joint Plan of Action, an interim agreement signed between Iran and the P5+1 countries in November 2013. Iran and the P5+1 countries engaged in negotiations for the next 20 months and, in April 2015, agreed on an "Iran nuclear deal framework" for the final agreement. In July 2015, Iran and the P5+1 confirmed agreement on the plan, along with the "Roadmap Agreement" between Iran and the IAEA.

After the Trump administration twice certified Iran's compliance in 2017, in May 2018 the United States withdrew from JCPOA as Trump pledged he would negotiate a better deal. Trump left office without fulfilling that pledge and analysts determined Iran had moved closer to developing a nuclear weapon since the American withdrawal.

Timeline
Under the JCPOA, Iran agreed to eliminate its stockpile of medium-enriched uranium, cut its stockpile of low-enriched uranium by 98%, and reduce by about two-thirds the number of its gas centrifuges for 13 years. For the next 15 years, Iran agreed to enrich uranium only up to 3.67%. Iran also agreed not to build any new heavy-water facilities for the same period of time. Uranium-enrichment activities will be limited to a single facility using first-generation centrifuges for 10 years. Other facilities will be converted to avoid proliferation risks. To monitor and verify Iran's compliance with the agreement, the International Atomic Energy Agency (IAEA) will have regular access to all Iranian nuclear facilities. The agreement provides that in return for verifiably abiding by its commitments, Iran will receive relief from the U.S., European Union, and United Nations Security Council nuclear-related sanctions.

On 12 October 2017, U.S. President Donald Trump announced that the United States would not make the certification provided for under U.S. domestic law, but stopped short of terminating the deal.

In 2018, IAEA inspectors spent an aggregate of 3,000 calendar days in Iran, installing tamper-proof seals and collecting surveillance camera photos, measurement data, and documents for further analysis. IAEA Director Yukiya Amano stated (in March 2018) that the organization has verified that Iran is implementing its nuclear-related commitments. On 30 April 2018 the United States and Israel said that Iran had not disclosed a past covert nuclear weapons program to the IAEA, as required by the 2015 deal.

On 8 May 2018, Trump announced United States withdrawal from JCPOA. Following the U.S. withdrawal, the EU enacted an updated blocking statute on 7 August 2018 to nullify U.S. sanctions on countries trading with Iran. In November 2018 U.S. sanctions came back into effect intended to force Iran to dramatically alter its policies, including its support for militant groups in the region and its development of ballistic missiles.

In May 2019, the IAEA certified that Iran was abiding by the deal's main terms, though questions were raised about how many advanced centrifuges Iran was allowed to have, as that was only loosely defined in the deal.

On 1 July 2019, Iran announced that it had breached the limit set on its stockpile of low-enriched uranium, which the IAEA confirmed.

On 5 January 2020, in the aftermath of the Baghdad Airport Airstrike that targeted and killed Iranian general Qassem Soleimani, Iran declared that it would no longer abide by the deal's limitations but would continue to coordinate with the IAEA, leaving open the possibility of resuming compliance. In December 2020, Iranian officials expressed further willingness to rejoin the deal, provided that U.S. officials make assurances regarding lifting sanctions and also rejoin the deal.

Background

Nuclear technology
A nuclear weapon uses a fissile material to cause a nuclear chain reaction. The most commonly used materials have been uranium 235 (U-235) and plutonium 239 (Pu-239). Both uranium 233 (U-233) and reactor-grade plutonium have also been used. The amount of uranium or plutonium needed depends on the sophistication of the design, with a simple design requiring approximately 15 kg of uranium or 6 kg of plutonium, and a sophisticated design requiring as little as 9 kg of uranium or 2 kg of plutonium. Plutonium is almost nonexistent in nature, and natural uranium is about 99.3% uranium 238 (U-238) and 0.7% U-235. Therefore, to make a weapon, either uranium must be enriched, or plutonium must be produced. Uranium enrichment is also frequently necessary for nuclear power. For this reason, uranium enrichment is a dual-use technology, a technology that "can be used both for civilian and for military purposes". Key strategies to prevent proliferation of nuclear arms include limiting the number of operating uranium enrichment plants and controlling the export of nuclear technology and fissile material.

Iranian nuclear activity, conflict with IAEA and Western countries, 1970–2006

Iranian development of nuclear technology began in the 1970s, when the U.S. Atoms for Peace program began providing assistance to Iran, which was then led by the Shah. Iran signed the Treaty on the Non-Proliferation of Nuclear Weapons (NPT) in 1968 as a non-nuclear weapons state and ratified the NPT in 1970.

In 1979 the Iranian Revolution took place, and Iran's nuclear program, which had developed some baseline capacity, fell into disarray as "much of Iran's nuclear talent fled the country in the wake of the Revolution." Furthermore, Ayatollah Ruhollah Khomeini initially opposed nuclear technology, and Iran engaged in a costly war with Iraq from 1980 to 1988.

In the late 1980s Iran reinstated its nuclear program, with assistance from Pakistan (which entered into a bilateral agreement with Iran in 1992), China (which did the same in 1990), and Russia (which did the same in 1992 and 1995), and from the A.Q. Khan network. Iran "began pursuing an indigenous nuclear fuel cycle capability by developing a uranium mining infrastructure and experimenting with uranium conversion and enrichment".

In August 2002 the Paris-based National Council of Resistance of Iran, an Iranian dissident group, publicly revealed the existence of two undeclared nuclear facilities, the Arak heavy-water production facility and the Natanz enrichment facility. In February 2003 Iranian President Mohammad Khatami acknowledged the existence of the facilities and asserted that Iran had undertaken "small-scale enrichment experiments" to produce low-enriched uranium for nuclear power plants. In late February International Atomic Energy Agency (IAEA) inspectors visited Natanz. In May 2003 Iran allowed IAEA inspectors to visit the Kalaye Electric Company but refused to allow them to take samples.

In June 2003, an IAEA report concluded that Iran had failed to meet its obligations under the safeguards agreement, and Iran, faced with the prospect of being referred to the UN Security Council, entered into diplomatic negotiations with France, Germany, and the United Kingdom (the EU 3). The United States refused to be involved in these negotiations. In October 2003 the Tehran Declaration was reached between Iran and the EU 3; under this declaration Iran agreed to cooperate fully with the IAEA, sign the Additional Protocol, and temporarily suspend all uranium enrichment. In September and October 2003 the IAEA conducted several facility inspections. This was followed by the Paris Agreement in November 2004, in which Iran agreed to temporarily suspend enrichment and conversion activities, "including the manufacture, installation, testing, and operation of centrifuges, and committed to working with the EU-3 to find a mutually beneficial long-term diplomatic solution".

In August 2005, the newly elected president of Iran, Mahmoud Ahmadinejad, promptly accused Iranian negotiators who had negotiated the Paris Accords of treason. Over the next two months, the EU 3 agreement fell apart as talks over the EU 3's proposed Long Term Agreement broke down; the Iranian government "felt that the proposal was heavy on demands, light on incentives, did not incorporate Iran's proposals, and violated the Paris Agreement". Iran notified the IAEA that it would resume uranium conversion at Esfahan.

In February 2006 Iran ended its voluntary implementation of the Additional Protocol and resumed enrichment at Natanz, prompting the IAEA Board of Governors to refer Iran to the UN Security Council. After the vote, Iran announced it would resume enrichment of uranium. In April 2006 Ahmadinejad announced that Iran had nuclear technology but said that it was purely for power generation, not weapons. In June 2006 the EU 3 joined China, Russia, and the United States, to form the P5+1. The following month, July 2006, the UN Security Council passed its first resolution (nr. 1696), demanding Iran stop uranium enrichment and processing, because of "serious concern" about "a number of outstanding issues and concerns on Iran's nuclear programme, including topics which could have a military nuclear dimension". Another UN Security Council resolution followed in December 2006 (nr. 1737); others followed later. The legal authority for the IAEA Board of Governors referral and the Security Council resolutions derived from the IAEA Statute and the United Nations Charter. The resolutions demanded that Iran cease enrichment activities, and the second resolution (Dec. 2006) also imposed sanctions on Iran, including bans on the transfer of nuclear and missile technology to the country and freezes on the assets of certain Iranian individuals and entities, in order to pressure the country.

In July 2006, Iran opened the Arak heavy water production plant, which led to one of the Security Council resolutions.

Prolonged conflict of Iran with U.S. and European countries, 2007–2015
Four more UN Security Council resolutions concerning Iran's nuclear program followed: 1747 (March 2007), 1803 (March 2008), 1835 (September 2008), and 1929 (June 2010). In Resolution 1803 and elsewhere the Security Council acknowledged Iran's rights under Article IV of the NPT, which provides for "the inalienable right ... to develop research, production and use of nuclear energy for peaceful purposes".

In a February 2007 interview with the Financial Times, IAEA director-general Mohamed ElBaradei said that military action against Iran "would be catastrophic, counterproductive" and called for negotiations between the international community and Iran over the Iranian nuclear program. ElBaradei specifically proposed a "double, simultaneous suspension, a time out" as "a confidence-building measure", under which the international sanctions would be suspended and Iran would suspend enrichment. ElBaradei also said, "if I look at it from a weapons perspective there are much more important issues to me than the suspension of [enrichment]," naming his top priorities as preventing Iran from "go[ing] to industrial capacity until the issues are settled"; building confidence, with "full inspection" involving Iranian adoption of the Additional Protocol; and "at all costs" preventing Iran from "moving out of the [treaty-based non-proliferation] system".

A November 2007 U.S. National Intelligence Estimate assessed that Iran "halted its nuclear weapons program" in 2003; that estimate and subsequent U.S. Intelligence Community statements also assessed that the Iranian government at the time was "keeping open the 'option' to develop nuclear weapons" in the future.

In September 2009 U.S. President Barack Obama revealed the existence of an underground enrichment facility in Fordow, near Qom, saying, "Iran's decision to build yet another nuclear facility without notifying the IAEA represents a direct challenge to the basic compact at the center of the non-proliferation regime." Israel threatened to take military action against Iran.

In March 2013 the United States began a series of secret bilateral talks with Iranian officials in Oman, led by William J. Burns and Jake Sullivan on the American side and Ali Asghar Khaji on the Iranian side. In June 2013 Hassan Rouhani was elected president of Iran. Rouhani has been described as "more moderate, pragmatic and willing to negotiate than Ahmadinejad". But in a 2006 nuclear negotiation with European powers, Rouhani said that Iran had used the negotiations to dupe the Europeans, saying that during the negotiations, Iran managed to master the conversion of uranium yellowcake at Isfahan. The conversion of yellowcake is an important step in the nuclear fuel process. In August 2013, three days after his inauguration, Rouhani called for a resumption of serious negotiations with the P5+1 on the Iranian nuclear program. In September 2013 Obama and Rouhani spoke by telephone, the first high-level contact between U.S. and Iranian leaders since 1979, and U.S. Secretary of State John Kerry met with Iranian foreign minister Mohammad Javad Zarif, signaling that the two countries were open to cooperation. Former officials alleged that, in order to advance the deal, the Obama administration shielded Hezbollah from the Drug Enforcement Administration's Project Cassandra investigation regarding drug smuggling and from the Central Intelligence Agency. As a result of the Politico report, Attorney General Jeff Sessions ordered an investigation to determine the veracity of the allegations.

On 24 November 2013, after several rounds of negotiations, the Joint Plan of Action, an interim agreement on the Iranian nuclear program, was signed between Iran and the P5+1 countries in Geneva, Switzerland. It consisted of a short-term freeze of portions of Iran's nuclear program in exchange for decreased economic sanctions on Iran, as the countries work towards a long-term agreement. The IAEA began "more intrusive and frequent inspections" under this interim agreement. The agreement was formally activated on 20 January 2014. That day, the IAEA issued a report stating that Iran was adhering to the terms of the interim agreement, including stopping enrichment of uranium to 20%, beginning the dilution process (to reduce half of the stockpile of 20% enriched uranium to 3.5%), and halting work on the Arak heavy-water reactor.

A major focus on the negotiations was limitations on Iran's key nuclear facilities: the Arak IR-40 heavy water reactor and production plant (which was under construction, but never became operational, as Iran agreed as part of the November 2013 Joint Plan of Action (interim agreement) not to commission or fuel the reactor); the Bushehr Nuclear Power Plant; the Gachin uranium mine; the Fordow Fuel Enrichment Plant; the Isfahan uranium-conversion plant; the Natanz uranium enrichment plant; and the Parchin military research and development complex.

A July 2015 Congressional Research Service report said, "statements from the U.S. intelligence community indicate that Iran has the technological and industrial capacity to produce nuclear weapons at some point, but the U.S. government assesses that Tehran has not mastered all of the necessary technologies for building a nuclear weapon."

Negotiations (2013–2015)

The agreement between the P5+1+EU and Iran on the Joint Comprehensive Plan of Action (JCPOA) is the culmination of 20 months of "arduous" negotiations.

The agreement followed the Joint Plan of Action (JPA), an interim agreement between the P5+1 powers and Iran that was agreed to on 24 November 2013 at Geneva. The Geneva agreement was an interim deal, in which Iran agreed to roll back parts of its nuclear program in exchange for relief from some sanctions. This went into effect on 20 January 2014. The parties agreed to extend their talks with a first extension deadline on 24 November 2014 and a second extension deadline set to 1 July 2015.

An Iran nuclear deal framework was reached on 2 April 2015. Under this framework Iran agreed tentatively to accept restrictions on its nuclear program, all of which would last for at least a decade and some longer, and to submit to an increased intensity of international inspections under a framework deal. These details were to be negotiated by the end of June 2015. The negotiations toward a Joint Comprehensive Plan of Action were extended several times until the final agreement, the Joint Comprehensive Plan of Action, was finally reached on 14 July 2015. The JCPOA is based on the framework agreement from three months earlier.

Subsequently the negotiations between Iran and the P5+1 continued. In April 2015 a framework deal was reached at Lausanne. Intense marathon negotiations then continued, with the last session in Vienna at the Palais Coburg lasting for seventeen days. At several points, negotiations appeared to be at risk of breaking down, but negotiators managed to come to agreement. As the negotiators neared a deal, U.S. Secretary of State John Kerry directly asked Iranian Foreign Minister Mohammad Javad Zarif to confirm that he was "authorized to actually make a deal, not just by the [Iranian] president, but by the supreme leader?" Zarif gave assurances that he was.

Ultimately, on 14 July 2015 all parties agreed to a landmark comprehensive nuclear agreement. At the time of the announcement, shortly before 11:00 GMT, the agreement was released to the public.

The final agreement's complexity shows the impact of a public letter written by a bipartisan group of 19 U.S. diplomats, experts, and others in June 2015, written when negotiations were still ongoing. The letter outlined concerns about the several provisions in the then-unfinished agreement and called for a number of improvements to strengthen the prospective agreement and win their support for it. After the final agreement was reached, one of the early negotiators, Robert J. Einhorn, a former U.S. Department of State official now at the Brookings Institution, said of the agreement: "Analysts will be pleasantly surprised. The more things are agreed to, the less opportunity there is for implementation difficulties later on."

The final agreement is based upon (and buttresses) "the rules-based nonproliferation regime created by the Nuclear Non-Proliferation Treaty (NPT) and including especially the IAEA safeguards system".

Participants
According to the U.S. State Department (Assistant Secretary for Legislative Affairs Julia Frifield), "The JCPOA is not a treaty or an executive agreement, and is not a signed document. The JCPOA reflects political commitments between Iran, the P5+1, and the EU."

JCPOA timetable
The JCPOA is part of UN Security Council Resolution 2231. The members of the UN Security Council voted on it on 20 July 2015, and adopted it on 18 October (Adoption Day). It came into effect on 16 January 2016 (Implementation Day). The JCPOA stays in effect for eight years from Adoption Day or upon receipt by the Security Council of an IAEA report stating that the IAEA has reached the Broader Conclusion that all nuclear material in Iran remains in peaceful activities (Transition Day), and terminates ten years from Adoption Day (Termination Day).

JCPOA provisions
The Joint Comprehensive Plan of Action (JCPOA) runs to 109 pages, including five annexes. The major provisions are:

Nuclear

 Iran's stockpile of low-enriched uranium was reduced by 97%, from 10,000 kg to 300 kg. This reduction will be maintained for 15 years. For the same 15-year period, Iran will be limited to enriching uranium to 3.67%, a percentage sufficient for civilian nuclear power and research, but not for building a nuclear weapon. However, the number of centrifuges is sufficient for a nuclear weapon, but not for nuclear power. This is a "major decline" in Iran's previous nuclear activity; before watering down its stockpile pursuant to the Joint Plan of Action interim agreement, Iran had enriched uranium to near 20% (medium-enriched uranium). These enriched uranium in excess of 300 kg of up to 3.67% will be down blended to natural uranium level or be sold in return for natural uranium, and the uranium enriched to between 5% and 20% will be fabricated into fuel plates for the Tehran Research Reactor or sold or diluted to an enrichment level of 3.67%. P5+1 will facilitate the implementation of the commercial contracts. After fifteen years, all physical limits on enrichment will be removed, including limits on the type and number of centrifuges, Iran's stockpile of enriched uranium, and where Iran may have enrichment facilities. According to Belfer, at this point Iran could "expand its nuclear program to create more practical overt and covert nuclear weapons options".
 For ten years, Iran will place over two-thirds of its centrifuges in storage, from its current stockpile of 19,000 centrifuges (of which 10,000 were operational) to no more than 6,104 operational centrifuges, with only 5,060 allowed to enrich uranium, with the enrichment capacity being limited to the Natanz plant. The centrifuges there must be IR-1 centrifuges, the first-generation centrifuge type which is Iran's oldest and least efficient; Iran will give up its advanced IR-2M centrifuges in this period. The non-operating centrifuges will be stored in Natanz and monitored by IAEA, but may be used to replace failed centrifuges. Iran will not build any new uranium-enrichment facilities for fifteen years.
 Iran may continue research and development work on enrichment, but that work will take place only at the Natanz facility and include certain limitations for the first eight years. This is intended to keep the country to a one-year breakout time.
 With cooperation from the "Working Group" (the P5+1 and possibly other countries), Iran is to modernise and rebuild the Arak heavy water research reactor based on an agreed design to support its peaceful nuclear research and production needs and purposes, but in such a way to minimise the production of plutonium and not to produce weapons-grade plutonium. The thermal power of the redesigned reactor will not exceed 20 MW. The P5+1 parties will support and facilitate the timely and safe construction of the Arak complex. All spent fuel will be sent out of the country. All excess heavy water which is beyond Iran's needs for the redesigned reactor will be made available for export to the international market based on international prices. In exchange, Iran received 130 tonnes of uranium in 2015 and in late 2016 was approved to receive 130 tonnes in 2017. For 15 years Iran will not engage in, or research, spent fuel reprocessing. Iran will also not build any additional heavy-water reactors or accumulate heavy water for 15 years.
 Iran's Fordow facility will stop enriching uranium and researching uranium enrichment for at least fifteen years; the facility will be converted into a nuclear physics and technology center. For 15 years Fordow will maintain no more than 1,044 IR-1 centrifuges in six cascades in one wing of Fordow. "Two of those six cascades will spin without uranium and will be transitioned, including through appropriate infrastructure modification," for stable radioisotope production for medical, agricultural, industrial, and scientific use. "The other four cascades with all associated infrastructure will remain idle." Iran will not be permitted to have any fissile material in Fordow.
 Iran is implementing an Additional Protocol that will continue in perpetuity for as long as Iran remains a party to the Nuclear Non-Proliferation Treaty (NPT). The signing of the Additional Protocol represents a continuation of the monitoring and verification provisions "long after the comprehensive agreement between the P5+1 and Iran is implemented".
 A comprehensive inspections regime will be implemented in order to monitor and confirm that Iran is complying with its obligations and is not diverting any fissile material.
 The IAEA will have multilayered oversight "over Iran's entire nuclear supply chain, from uranium mills to its procurement of nuclear-related technologies". For declared nuclear sites such as Fordow and Natanz, the IAEA will have "round-the-clock access" to nuclear facilities and will be entitled to maintain continuous monitoring (including via surveillance equipment) at such sites. The agreement authorizes the IAEA to make use of sophisticated monitoring technology, such as fiber-optic seals on equipment that can electronically send information to the IAEA; infrared satellite imagery to detect covert sites, "environmental sensors that can detect minute signs of nuclear particles"; tamper-resistant, radiation-resistant cameras. Other tools include computerized accounting programs to gather information and detect anomalies, and big data sets on Iranian imports, to monitor dual-use items.
 The number of IAEA inspectors assigned to Iran will triple, from 50 to 150 inspectors.
 If IAEA inspectors have concerns that Iran is developing nuclear capabilities at any non-declared sites, they may request access "to verify the absence of undeclared nuclear materials and activities or activities inconsistent with" the agreement, informing Iran of the basis for their concerns. The inspectors would only come from countries with which Iran has diplomatic relations. Iran may admit the inspectors to such site or propose alternatives to inspection that might satisfy the IAEA's concerns. If such an agreement cannot be reached, a process running to a maximum of 24 days is triggered. Under this process, Iran and the IAEA have 14 days to resolve disagreements among themselves. If they fail to, the Joint Commission (including all eight parties) would have one week in which to consider the intelligence which initiated the IAEA request. A majority of the Commission (at least five of the eight members) could then inform Iran of the action that it would be required to take within three more days. The majority rule provision "means the United States and its European allies—Britain, France, Germany and the EU—could insist on access or any other steps and that Iran, Russia or China could not veto them". If Iran did not comply with the decision within three days, sanctions would be automatically reimposed under the snapback provision (see below).

As a result of the above, the "breakout time"—the time in which it would be possible for Iran to make enough material for a single nuclear weapon—will increase from two to three months to one year, according to U.S. officials and U.S. intelligence. An August 2015 report published by a group of experts at Harvard University's Belfer Center for Science and International Affairs concurs in these estimates, writing that under the JCPOA, "over the next decade would be extended to roughly a year, from the current estimated breakout time of 2 to 3 months". The Center for Arms Control and Non-Proliferation also accepts these estimates. By contrast, Alan J. Kuperman, coordinator of the Nuclear Proliferation Prevention Project at the University of Texas at Austin, disputed the one-year assessment, arguing that under the agreement, Iran's breakout time "would be only about three months, not much longer than it is today".

The longer breakout time would be in place for at least ten years; after that point, the breakout time would gradually decrease. By the 15th year, U.S. officials say the breakout time would return to the pre-JCPOA status quo of a few months. The Belfer Center report states: "Some contributors to this report believe that breakout time by year 15 could be comparable to what it is today—a few months—while others believe it could be reduced to a few weeks."

Exemptions
Reuters reported that exemptions were granted to Iran prior to 16 January 2016. The reported purpose of the exemptions was so that sanctions relief and other benefits could start by that date, instead of Iran being in violation. The exemptions included: (a) Iran able to exceed the 300 kg of 3.5% LEU limit in the agreement; (b) Iran able to exceed the zero kg of 20% LEU limit in the agreement; (c) Iran to keep operating 19 "hot cells" that exceed the size limit in the agreement; (d) Iran to maintain control of 50 tonnes of heavy water that exceed the 130 tonne limit in the agreement by storing the excess at an Iran-controlled facility in Oman. In December 2016, the IAEA published decisions of the Joint Commission that spell out these clarifications of the JCPOA.

Sanctions

 Following the issuance of a IAEA report verifying implementation by Iran of the nuclear-related measures, the UN sanctions against Iran and some EU sanctions will terminate and some will be suspended. Once sanctions are lifted, Iran will recover approximately $100 billion of its assets (U.S. Treasury Department estimate) frozen in overseas banks.
 Eight years into the agreement, EU sanctions against a number of Iranian companies, individuals and institutions (such as the Revolutionary Guards) will be lifted.
 The United States will "cease" application of its nuclear-related secondary sanctions by presidential action or executive waiver. Secondary sanctions are those that sanction other countries for doing business with Iran. Primary U.S. sanctions, which prohibit U.S. firms from conducting commercial transactions with few exceptions, are not altered by the JCPOA.
 This step is not tied to any specific date, but is expected to occur "roughly in the first half of 2016".
 Sanctions relating to ballistic missile technologies would remain for eight years; similar sanctions on conventional weapon sales to Iran would remain for five years.
 However, all U.S. sanctions against Iran related to alleged human rights abuses, missiles, and support for terrorism are not affected by the agreement and will remain in place. U.S. sanctions are viewed as more stringent, since many have extraterritorial effect (i.e., they apply worldwide). EU sanctions, by contrast, apply only in Europe.
 No new UN or EU nuclear-related sanctions or restrictive measures will be imposed.
 If Iran violates the agreement, any of the P5+1 can invoke a "snap back" provision, under which the sanctions "snap back" into place (i.e., are reimplemented).
Specifically, the JCPOA establishes the following dispute resolution process: if a party to the JCPOA has reason to believe that another party is not upholding its commitments under the agreement, then the complaining party may refer its complaint to the Joint Commission, a body created under the JCPOA to monitor implementation. If a complaint made by a non-Iran party is not resolved to the satisfaction of the complaining party within 35 days of referral, then that party may treat the unresolved issue as grounds to cease performing its commitments under the JCPOA, notify the United Nations Security Council that it believes the issue constitutes significant nonperformance, or both. The Security Council would then have 30 days to adopt a resolution to continue the lifting of sanctions. If such a resolution is not adopted within those 30 days, then the sanctions of all the pre-JCPOA nuclear-related UN Security Council resolutions would automatically be reimposed. Iran has stated that in such a case, it would cease performing its nuclear obligations under the deal. The effect of this rule is that any permanent member of the Security Council (United States, United Kingdom, China, Russia or France) can veto any ongoing sanctions relief, but no member can veto the reimposition of sanctions.
Snapback sanctions "would not apply with retroactive effect to contracts signed between any party and Iran or Iranian individuals and entities prior to the date of application, provided that the activities contemplated under and execution of such contracts are consistent with this JCPOA and the previous and current UN Security Council resolutions".

Ankit Panda of The Diplomat has said that this will make impossible any scenario where Iran is noncompliant with the JCPOA yet escapes reimposition of sanctions. But Mark Dubowitz of the Foundation for Defense of Democracies (which opposes the agreement) has argued that because the JCPOA provides that Iran could treat reinstatement of sanctions (in part or entirely) as grounds for leaving the agreement, the U.S. would be reluctant to impose a "snapback" for smaller violations: "The only thing you'll take to the Security Council are massive Iranian violations, because you're certainly not going to risk the Iranians walking away from the deal and engaging in nuclear escalation over smaller violations."

15-year term
After the 15 years, many provisions of the JCPOA will expire, including most restrictions on Iran's enrichment program. At that time, in 2030, most people involved in the 1979 revolution will no longer be politically active. Some critics of the treaty consider it plausible that Iran could then make a nuclear bomb. But Iran should also have ratified the Additional Protocol and will thus be subject to enhanced inspection and oversight by the IAEA.

International reaction

The JCPOA received a mixed international reaction. Many countries expressed hope that it could achieve the denuclearization of Iran, while some of Iran's neighbouring countries, including Israel, and some U.S. lawmakers expressed distrust of the agreement, seeing it as seriously defective. Zarif's "Never threaten an Iranian!" remark during the nuclear negotiations gained attention from numerous global news agencies, with mixed reviews.

Records
According to several commentators, JCPOA is the first of its kind in the annals of non-proliferation and is in many aspects unique. The 159-page JCPOA document and its five appendices, is the most spacious text of a multinational treaty since World War II, according to BBC Persian.

This is the first time that the United Nations Security Council has recognized the nuclear enrichment program of a developing country and backs an agreement signed by several countries within the framework of a resolution (United Nations Security Council Resolution 2231). For the first time in the history of the United Nations, a country—Iran—was able to abolish 6 UN resolutions against it—1696, 1737, 1747, 1803, 1835, 1929—without even one day of implementing them. Sanctions against Iran were also lifted for the first time.

Throughout the history of international law, this is the first and only time that a country subject to Chapter VII of the United Nations Charter has managed to end its case and stop being subject to this chapter through diplomacy. All other cases have ended through either regime change, war or full implementation of the Security Council's decisions by the country.

Gary Sick states that during the history of the Nuclear Non-Proliferation Treaty (NPT), no country other than Iran has ever voluntarily agreed to put such extraordinary restrictions on its nuclear activities.

During the final negotiations, U.S. Secretary of State John Kerry stayed in Vienna for 17 days, making him the top American official devoting time to a single international negotiation in more than four decades. Mohammad Javad Zarif broke the record of an Iranian Foreign Minister being far from home with 18-days stay in Vienna, and set the record of 106 days of negotiations in 687 days, a number higher than any other chief nuclear negotiator in 12 years. The negotiations became the longest continuous negotiations with the presence of all foreign ministers of the permanent members of the United Nations Security Council.

The negotiations included 'rare events' in Iran–United States relations not only since the 1979 Iranian Revolution, but also in the history of the bilateral relations. The U.S. Secretary of State and Iranian Foreign Minister met on 18 different dates—sometimes multiple occasions a day—and in 11 different cities, unprecedented since the beginning of the relations. On 27 April 2015, Kerry visited the official residence of the Permanent Representative of Iran to the United Nations to meet his counterpart. The encounter was the first of its kind since the Iran hostage crisis. On the sidelines of the 70th session of the United Nations General Assembly, President Obama shook hands with Zarif, marking the first such event in history. The event was also noted in form of diplomatic ranks, as a head of state shook hands with a minister. Obama is reported to have said in the meeting: "Too much effort has been put into the JCPOA and we all should be diligent to implement it."

Process

Incorporation into international law by the United Nations Security Council

As provided for in the JCPOA, the agreement was formally endorsed by the UN Security Council. There is disagreement about whether the deal is legally binding on the United States.

On 15 July 2015, the American ambassador to the UN, Samantha Power, circulated a 14-page draft to Council members. On 20 July 2015, the Security Council unanimously approved the resolution—United Nations Security Council resolution 2231—in a 15–0 vote. The resolution delayed its official implementation for 90 days to allow for U.S. Congressional consideration under the Iran Nuclear Agreement Review Act of 2015. The resolution laid out the steps for terminating sanctions imposed by seven past Security Council resolutions, but retained an arms embargo and ballistic missile technology ban. The resolution did not affect sanctions imposed separately by the United States and the European Union. It also codified the "snapback" mechanism of the agreement, under which all Security Council sanctions will be automatically reimposed if Iran breaches the deal.

Speaking immediately after the vote, Power told the Security Council that sanctions relief would start only when Iran "verifiably" met its obligations. Power also called upon Iran "to immediately release all unjustly detained Americans", specifically naming Amir Hekmati, Saeed Abedini, and Jason Rezaian, who were detained at the time, and Robert A. Levinson, who had been missing in the country. Hekmati, Abedini, and Rezaian were subsequently released in a January 2016 prisoner exchange, which Secretary of State Kerry said had been accelerated by the nuclear agreement.

Approval by European Union
On the same day that the Security Council approved a resolution, the European Union formally approved the JCPOA via a vote of the EU Foreign Affairs Council (the group of EU foreign ministers) meeting in Brussels. This sets into motion the lifting of certain EU sanctions, including those prohibiting the purchase of Iranian oil. The EU continues its sanctions relating to human rights and its sanctions prohibiting the export of ballistic missile technology. The approval by the EU was seen as a signal to the U.S. Congress.

Review period in the United States Congress

Under U.S. law, the JCPOA is a non-binding political commitment. According to the U.S. State Department, it specifically is not an executive agreement nor a treaty (as defined in U.S. law). There are widespread incorrect reports that it is an executive agreement. In contrast to treaties, which require two-thirds of the Senate to consent to ratification, political commitments require no congressional approval and are not legally binding as a matter of domestic law (although in some cases they may be "treaties" and be binding on the U.S. as a matter of international law).

On 22 May 2015, President Obama signed the Iran Nuclear Agreement Review Act of 2015 into law; this legislation passed the Senate by a 98–1 vote and the House by a 400–25 vote, and was approved by Obama on 22 May 2015. Under the Act, once a nuclear agreement was negotiated with Iran, Congress had 60 days in which to pass a resolution of approval, a resolution of disapproval, or do nothing. The Act also included additional time beyond the 60 days for the president to veto a resolution and for Congress to vote on whether to override or sustain the veto. Congress could defeat the deal only if it mustered the two-thirds of both houses needed to override an expected veto by Obama of any resolution of disapproval.

On 19 July 2015, the State Department officially transmitted to Congress the JCPOA, its annexes, and related materials. These documents included the Unclassified Verification Assessment Report on the JCPOA and the Intelligence Community's Classified Annex to the Verification Assessment Report. The 60-day review period began the next day, 20 July, and ended on 17 September. Senator Ted Cruz introduced a resolution seeking a delay in the review period, arguing that the 60-day congressional review under the Act should not begin until the Senate obtained a copy of all bilateral Iran–IAEA documents. This resolution did not pass. Ultimately a resolution of disapproval was brought to the Senate floor but failed. A resolution of approval was brought to the House floor, but it too failed. As a result, the agreement went into effect following the congressional review period.

Obama administration
The JCPOA was the culmination of many years of international effort as well as a high-priority foreign policy goal of the Obama administration.

In comments made in the East Room of the White House on 15 July 2015, Obama urged Congress to support the agreement, saying "If we don't choose wisely, I believe future generations will judge us harshly, for letting this moment slip away." He said the inspections regime in the agreement was among the most vigorous ever negotiated and criticized opponents of the deal for failing to offer a viable alternative to it. Obama said, "If 99 percent of the world's community and the majority of nuclear experts look at this thing and they say 'this will prevent Iran from getting a nuclear bomb,' and you are arguing either that it does not ... then you should have some alternative to present. And I haven't heard that." The same day, he made a case for the deal on the agreement in an interview with New York Times columnist Thomas Friedman. Obama stated:

Also on 15 July 2015, Vice President Joe Biden met with Senate Democrats on the Foreign Relations Committee on Capitol Hill, where he made a presentation on the agreement.

On 18 July Obama devoted his weekly radio address to the agreement, saying, "this deal will make America and the world safer and more secure" and rebutting "a lot of overheated and often dishonest arguments about it"; Obama said, "as commander-in-chief, I make no apology for keeping this country safe and secure through the hard work of diplomacy over the easy rush to war." On 23 July Obama met in the White House Cabinet Room with about a dozen undecided House Democrats to speak about the agreement and seek their support.

The debate over the agreement was marked by acrimony between the White House and Republicans inside and outside of Congress. Cruz said that under the agreement "the Obama administration will become the leading financier of terrorism against America in the world." Former Governor Mike Huckabee of Arkansas, a candidate for the Republican presidential nomination, called the president "naive" and repeatedly invoked the Holocaust, saying that the president's policy would "take the Israelis and march them to the door of the oven". This comparison was denounced by the Anti-Defamation League, the National Jewish Democratic Council, and various Israeli government officials. At a 27 July 2015 news conference Obama specifically criticized Huckabee, Cruz, and Cotton, saying that such remarks were "just part of a general pattern we've seen that would be considered ridiculous if it weren't so sad", especially from "leaders in the Republican Party". Obama said, "fling[ing] out ad hominem attacks like that ... doesn't help inform the American people". "This is a deal that has been endorsed by people like Brent Scowcroft and Sam Nunn ... historic Democratic and Republican leaders on arms control and on keeping America safe. And so when you get rhetoric like this, maybe it gets attention and maybe this is just an effort to push Mr. Trump out of the headlines, but it's not the kind of leadership that is needed for America right now", he added.

On 5 August Obama gave a speech before an audience of around 200 at American University, marking a new phase in the administration's campaign for the agreement. He said, "Let's not mince words: The choice we face is ultimately between diplomacy and some form of war—maybe not tomorrow, maybe not three months from now, but soon. How can we in good conscience justify war before we've tested a diplomatic agreement that achieves our objectives?" In his speech, Obama also invoked a speech made by John F. Kennedy at American University in 1963 in favor of the Partial Nuclear Test Ban Treaty. Obama also said the opponents of the agreement were the same people who created the "drumbeat of war" that led to the Iraq War and criticized "knee-jerk partisanship that has become all too familiar, rhetoric that renders every decision made to be a disaster, a surrender".

New York Senator Chuck Schumer, a senior Democrat, made a different assessment of prospects for war by distinguishing between nuclear and non-nuclear aspects of the agreement. In each case he asked whether we are better off with the agreement or without it, and his conclusion was: "when it comes to the nuclear aspects of the agreement within ten years, we might be slightly better off with it. However, when it comes to the nuclear aspects after ten years and the non-nuclear aspects, we would be better off without it." Then Schumer assessed the Iranian government, saying, "Who's to say this dictatorship will not prevail for another ten, twenty, or thirty years? To me, the very real risk that Iran will not moderate and will, instead, use the agreement to pursue its nefarious goals is too great." Finally, Schumer concluded: "I will vote to disapprove the agreement, not because I believe war is a viable or desirable option, nor to challenge the path of diplomacy. It is because I believe Iran will not change, and under this agreement it will be able to achieve its dual goals of eliminating sanctions while ultimately retaining its nuclear and non-nuclear power."

In the same 5 August speech, Obama said, "Just because Iranian hard-liners chant 'Death to America' does not mean that that's what all Iranians believe. In fact, it's those hard-liners who are most comfortable with the status quo. It's those hard-liners chanting 'Death to America' who have been most opposed to the deal. They're making common cause with the Republican caucus." Congressional Republican leaders criticized this statement. Senate Majority Leader Mitch McConnell called it "crass political rhetoric" that was a strategy to "Demonize your opponents, gin up the base, get the Democrats all angry, and rally around the president." McConnell said, "This is an enormous national security debate that the president will leave behind, under the Constitution, a year and a half from now, and the rest of us will be dealing with the consequences of it. So I wish he would tone down the rhetoric and let's talk about the facts" and promised that Republicans would discuss the agreement respectfully in September. Republican Senator Bob Corker, the chairman of Foreign Relations Committee, asserted that the president was "trying to shut down debate by saying that those who have legitimate questions, legitimate questions—are somehow unpatriotic, are somehow compared to hardliners in Iran". Obama subsequently stood by his statement, with White House Press Secretary Josh Earnest calling it a "statement of fact" and Obama saying in an interview, "Remember, what I said was that it's the hard-liners in Iran who are most opposed to this deal. And I said, in that sense, they're making common cause with those who are opposed to this deal here. I didn't say that they were equivalent." In the same interview Obama said, "A sizable proportion of the Republicans were opposed before the ink was even dry on the deal."

In comments made at the Aspen Security Forum in Aspen, Colorado in July 2015, Director of National Intelligence James Clapper said the JCPOA would improve the U.S.'s ability to monitor Iran: "[The agreement] puts us in a far better place in terms of insight and access" than no agreement. Clapper remained "concerned about compliance and deceit" but "pointed out that during the negotiation period [Iran] complied with rules" negotiated under the interim agreement (the Joint Plan of Action).

Public debate
An intense public debate in the United States took place during the congressional review period. "Some of the wealthiest and most powerful donors in American politics, those for and against the accord", became involved in the public debate, although "mega-donors" opposing the agreement contributed substantially more money than those supporting it. From 2010 to early August 2015, the foundations of Sheldon Adelson, Paul Singer, and Haim Saban contributed a total of $13 million (at least $7.5 million, at least $2.6 million, and at least $2.9 million, respectively) to advocacy groups opposing an agreement with Iran. On the other side, three groups lobbying in support of the agreement received at least $803,000 from the Ploughshares Fund, at least $425,000 from the Rockefeller Brothers Fund, and at least $68,500 from George Soros and his foundation. Other philanthropists and donors supporting an agreement include S. Daniel Abraham, Tim Gill, Norman Lear, Margery Tabankin, and Arnold Hiatt.

Others welcomed the JCPOA as a step forward. The National Iranian American Council (NIAC), Iranian American Bar Association, and other organizations welcomed the JCPOA. The NIAC released a statement saying: "Our negotiators have done their job to win a strong nuclear deal that prevents an Iranian nuclear weapon, all the while avoiding a catastrophic war. Now is the time for Congress to do theirs. Make no mistake: if Congress rejects this good deal with Iran, there will be no better deal forthcoming and Congress will be left owning an unnecessary war." NIAC created a new group, NIAC Action, to run advertisements supporting the agreement. NIAC also organized an open letter from 73 Middle East and foreign affairs scholars stating, "reactivating diplomatic channels between the United States and Iran is a necessary first step" to reduce conflict in the region, and that while "the nuclear deal will not automatically or immediately bring stability to the region ... Ultimately, a Middle East where diplomacy is the norm rather than the exception will enhance U.S. national security and interests." Signatories to the letter include John Esposito, Ehsan Yarshater, Noam Chomsky, Peter Beinart, John Mearsheimer, and Stephen Walt.

U.S. pro-Israel groups were divided on the JCPOA. The American Israel Public Affairs Committee opposed the agreement and formed a new 501(c)(4) group, Citizens for a Nuclear Free Iran, to run a television advertising campaign against it. In August 2015, it was reported that AIPAC and Citizens for a Nuclear Free Iran planned to spend between $20 million and $40 million on its campaign. From mid-July to 4 August 2015 AIPAC's Citizens for a Nuclear Free Iran spent more than $11 million on network television political advertisements opposing the agreement in 23 states, including more than $1 million in California, Florida, New York, and Texas. In the first week of August AIPAC said it had 400 meetings with congressional offices as part of its campaign to defeat the agreement.

In contrast to AIPAC, another pro-Israel organization, J Street, supported the agreement, and planned a $5 million advertising effort to encourage Congress to support it. In the first week of August J Street launched a $2 million, three-week ad campaign in support of the agreement, with TV ads in Colorado, Maryland, Michigan, Oregon, and Pennsylvania. From mid-July through early August, J Street reported having 125 meetings with congressional offices. J Street also paid to fly prominent Israelis who support the agreement (including Amram Mitzna, a retired Israeli general, member of the Knesset, and mayor of Haifa) to the United States to help persuade members of Congress to support it.

The group United Against Nuclear Iran (UANI) opposed the agreement and committed to spending more than $20 million on a national "TV, radio, print and digital campaign" against it. After UANI announced its opposition, the group's president and co-founder, nonproliferation expert Gary Samore, announced that he had concluded "that the accord was in the United States' interest" and supported the agreement. Samore thus stepped down as president and was replaced by ex-Senator Joseph I. Lieberman. By 20 August UANI had released its third national television ad against the agreement.

Various other groups also ran ad campaigns for or against the agreement. John R. Bolton's Foundation for American Security and Freedom ran ads against it, as did "Veterans Against the Deal", a group that does not disclose its donors. Various pro-agreement ads were run by MoveOn.org (which ran an ad titled "Let Diplomacy Work"), Americans United for Change (which warned "They're back—the Iraq war hawks are fighting the Iran deal, want more war" over photos of Bolton, Dick Cheney, and Donald Rumsfeld), and Global Zero (which ran a humorous ad featuring actors Jack Black, Morgan Freeman, and Natasha Lyonne).

The New York-based Iran Project, a nonprofit led by former high-level U.S. diplomats and funded by the Rockefeller Brothers Fund, along with the United Nations Association of the United States, supported the agreement. The Rockefeller fund also supported the San Francisco-based Ploughshares Fund, which spent several years marshaling support for an agreement.

On 17 July 2015, a bipartisan open letter endorsing the Iran agreement was signed by more than 100 former U.S. ambassadors and high-ranking State Department officials. The ex-ambassadors wrote: "If properly implemented, this comprehensive and rigorously negotiated agreement can be an effective instrument in arresting Iran's nuclear program and preventing the spread of nuclear weapons in the volatile and vitally important region of the Middle East. In our judgment the [plan] deserves Congressional support and the opportunity to show it can work. We firmly believe that the most effective way to protect U.S. national security, and that of our allies and friends is to ensure that tough-minded diplomacy has a chance to succeed before considering other more costly and risky alternatives." Among the signatories to the letter were Daniel C. Kurtzer, James R. Jones, Frank E. Loy, Princeton N. Lyman, Jack F. Matlock Jr., Donald F. McHenry, Thomas E. McNamara, and Thomas R. Pickering.

A separate public letter to Congress in support of the agreement from five former U.S. ambassadors to Israel from administrations of both parties and three former Under Secretaries of State was released on 26 July 2015. This letter was signed by R. Nicholas Burns, James B. Cunningham, William C. Harrop, Daniel Kurtzer, Thomas R. Pickering, Edward S. Walker Jr., and Frank G. Wisner. The former officials wrote, "We are persuaded that this agreement will put in place a set of constraints and monitoring measures that will arrest Iran's nuclear program for at least fifteen years and assure that this agreement will leave Iran no legitimate avenue to produce a nuclear weapon during the next ten to fifteen years. This landmark agreement removes the threat that a nuclear-armed Iran would pose to the region and to Israel specifically."

Another public letter to Congress urging approval of the agreement was signed by a bipartisan group of more than 60 "national-security leaders", including politicians, retired military officers, and diplomats. This letter, dated 20 July 2015, stated: "We congratulate President Obama and all the negotiators for a landmark agreement unprecedented in its importance for preventing the acquisition of nuclear weapons by Iran. ... We have followed carefully the negotiations as they have progressed and conclude that the JCPOA represents the achievement of greater security for us and our partners in the region." Among the Republicans who signed this letter were former Treasury Secretary Paul O'Neill, former U.S. Trade Representative Carla Anderson Hills, and former Senator Nancy Landon Kassebaum. Among the Democrats who signed the letter were former Secretary of State Madeleine Albright, former Senate Majority Leaders George J. Mitchell and Tom Daschle, former Senator Carl Levin, and former Defense Secretary William Perry. Also signing were former National Security Advisors Zbigniew Brzezinski and Brent Scowcroft; Under Secretaries of State R. Nicholas Burns and Thomas R. Pickering; U.S. Ambassadors Ryan Crocker and Stuart Eizenstat; Admiral Eric T. Olson; Under Secretary of Defense for Policy Michele Flournoy; and Assistant Secretary for Nonproliferation Robert Einhorn.

On 8 August 2015, 29 prominent U.S. scientists, mostly physicists, published an open letter endorsing the agreement. The letter, addressed to Obama, said: "We congratulate you and your team on negotiating a technically sound, stringent and innovative deal that will provide the necessary assurance in the coming decade and more than Iran is not developing nuclear weapons, and provides a basis for further initiatives to raise the barriers to nuclear proliferation in the Middle East and around the globe." The letter also stated that the agreement "will advance the cause of peace and security in the Middle East and can serve as a guidepost for future nonproliferation agreements". The 29 signatories included "some of the world's most knowledgeable experts in the fields of nuclear weapons and arms control", many of whom have held Q clearances and have been longtime advisers to Congress, the White House, and federal agencies. The five primary authors were Richard L. Garwin (a nuclear physicist who played a key role in the development of the first hydrogen bomb and whom The New York Times described as "among the last living physicists who helped usher in the nuclear age"); Robert J. Goldston (Director of the Princeton Program on Science and Global Security and former director of the Princeton Plasma Physics Laboratory); R. Scott Kemp (an MIT professor of Nuclear Science and Engineering and a former science advisor for nonproliferation and arms control at the State Department); Rush D. Holt (a physicist and former U.S. Representative who later became president of the American Association for the Advancement of Science); and Frank N. von Hippel (Princeton Professor of Public Policy and former assistant director for national security in the White House Office of Science and Technology Policy). Six Nobel Prize in Physics laureates co-signed the letter: Philip W. Anderson of Princeton University; Leon N. Cooper of Brown University; Sheldon L. Glashow of Boston University; David Gross of the University of California, Santa Barbara; Burton Richter of Stanford University; and Frank Wilczek of the Massachusetts Institute of Technology. Among the other scientists to sign are Siegfried S. Hecker (a Stanford physicist and the former director of Los Alamos National Laboratory), Freeman Dyson (of Princeton), and Sidney Drell (of Stanford).

An open letter endorsing the agreement signed by 36 retired military generals and admirals and titled "The Iran Deal Benefits U.S. National Security: An Open Letter from Retired Generals and Admirals" was released on 11 August 2015. The letter, signed by retired officers from all five branches of the U.S. armed services, said the agreement was "the most effective means currently available to prevent Iran from obtaining nuclear weapons" and "If at some point it becomes necessary to consider military action against Iran, gathering sufficient international support for such an effort would only be possible if we have first given the diplomatic path a chance. We must exhaust diplomatic options before moving to military ones." The signers included General James E. "Hoss" Cartwright of the Marine Corps, former Vice Chairman of the Joint Chiefs of Staff; General Joseph P. Hoar of the Marine Corps, the former commander of the U.S. Central Command; and Generals Merrill McPeak and Lloyd W. Newton of the Air Force. Other signers included Lieutenant Generals Robert G. Gard Jr. and Claudia J. Kennedy; Vice Admiral Lee F. Gunn; Rear Admirals Garland Wright and Joseph Sestak; and Major General Paul D. Eaton.

The above letter was answered on 25 August 2015 by a letter signed by more than 200 retired generals and admirals opposing the deal. The letter asserted: "The agreement does not 'cut off every pathway' for Iran to acquire nuclear weapons. To the contrary, it provides Iran with a legitimate pathway for doing exactly that simply by abiding by the deal. ... The JCPOA would threaten the national security and vital interests of the United States and, therefore, should be disapproved by the Congress." This letter was organized by Leon A. "Bud" Edney; other signers included Admiral James A. Lyons; Lieutenant General William G. Boykin, former Undersecretary of Defense for Intelligence; and Lieutenant General Thomas McInerney, former vice commander of U.S. Air Forces in Europe.

Retired Marine Corps General Anthony Zinni said he had refused requests from both sides to sign their letters, telling Time magazine, "I'm convinced that 90% of the guys who signed the letter one way or the other don't have any clue about whether it's a good or bad deal. They sign it because somebody's asked them to sign it." Of the JCPOA, Zinni said: "The agreement's fine, if you think it can work. But if this is a Neville Chamberlain then you're in a world of shit."

On 13 August retired Senators Carl Levin of Michigan, a Democrat, and John Warner of Virginia, a Republican, published an op-ed in support of the agreement, "Why hawks should also back the Iran deal", in Politico. Levin and Warner, both past chairmen of the Senate Armed Services Committee, argued, "If we reject the agreement, we risk isolating ourselves and damaging our ability to assemble the strongest possible coalition to stop Iran" in the event that military action was needed in the future. Levin and Warner wrote, "The deal on the table is a strong agreement on many counts, and it leaves in place the robust deterrence and credibility of a military option. We urge our former colleagues not to take any action which would undermine the deterrent value of a coalition that participates in and could support the use of a military option. The failure of the United States to join the agreement would have that effect." On 14 August retired senators Richard Lugar of Indiana, a Republican, and J. Bennett Johnston of Louisiana, a Democrat, also wrote in support of the agreement. In a column for Reuters Lugar and Johnston argued, "Rejection of the agreement would severely undermine the U.S. role as a leader and reliable partner around the globe. If Washington walks away from this hard-fought multilateral agreement, its dependability would likely be doubted for decades." They also wrote: "Tehran would be the winner of this U.S. rejection because it would achieve its major objective: the lifting of most sanctions without being required to accept constraints on its nuclear program. Iran could also claim to be a victim of American perfidy and try to convince other nations to break with U.S. leadership and with the entire international sanctions regime."

On 17 August 2015, a group of 75 arms control and nuclear nonproliferation experts issued a joint statement endorsing the agreement. The statement said, "the JCPOA is a strong, long-term, and verifiable agreement that will be a net-plus for international nuclear nonproliferation efforts" and that the JCPOA's "rigorous limits and transparency measures will make it very likely that any future effort by Iran to pursue nuclear weapons, even a clandestine program, would be detected promptly, providing the opportunity to intervene decisively to prevent Iran from acquiring a nuclear weapon". The letter was organized through the nonpartisan Arms Control Association. Among the 75 signatories were the Valerie Plame and Joseph C. Wilson; former IAEA director-general Hans Blix; Morton H. Halperin; and experts from the Brookings Institution, Stimson Center, and other think tanks.

Foreign diplomats were also involved in the congressional debate. The Israeli ambassador to the United States Ron Dermer appeared on cable television shows to attack the agreement, while ambassadors from European nations, including Sir Peter Westmacott, the British ambassador to the United States, "came on to say the precise opposite". Dermer also lobbied members of Congress on Capitol Hill against the agreement, while diplomats from France, Britain, and Germany made the rounds on Capitol Hill to advocate for the agreement. On 4 August P5+1 diplomats held "a rare meeting of world powers' envoys on Capitol Hill" with about 30 Senate Democrats to urge support for the agreement, saying, "If Congress rejects this good deal, and the U.S. is forced to walk away, Iran will be left with an unconstrained nuclear program with far weaker monitoring arrangements, the current international consensus on sanctions would unravel, and international unity and pressure on Iran would be seriously undermined."

On Meet the Press on 6 September 2015, former Secretary of State Colin Powell expressed support for the nuclear agreement with Iran, saying that it was "a pretty good deal". Powell said that various provisions accepted by Iran—such as the reduction in centrifuges and the uranium stockpile and the agreement to shut down its plutonium reactor—were "remarkable changes" that stopped the Iranian pathway to a nuclear weapons program. Powell also defended the verification provisions of the agreement, saying: "I think a very vigorous verification regime has been put into place."

Former Ambassador Dennis Ross, a longtime American negotiator in the Middle East, wrote that he was not yet convinced by either proponents or opponents of the agreement. Ross wrote that the United States should be focused on "deterring the Iranians from cheating" (e.g., by producing highly enriched uranium) after year fifteen of the agreement. Ross wrote, "President Obama emphasizes that the agreement is based on verification not trust. But our catching Iran cheating is less important than the price they know they will pay if we catch them. Deterrence needs to apply not just for the life of the deal." As part of a deterrence strategy, Ross proposed transferring to Israel the U.S. Massive Ordnance Penetrator (MOP) "bunker buster" bomb at some point before year 15 of the agreement. In a 25 August op-ed in The Washington Post, Ross and David H. Petraeus again argued for transferring the MOP to Israel.

The Jewish American community was divided on the agreement. On 19 August 2015 leaders of the Reform Jewish movement, the largest Jewish denomination in the United States, issued a lengthy public statement expressing a neutral position. The statement, signed by the leaders of the Union for Reform Judaism, Central Conference of American Rabbis, Religious Action Center of Reform Judaism and Association of Reform Zionists of America, reflected what Rabbi Rick Jacobs, president of the URJ, called "deep divisions within the movement". On 20 August 2015 a group of 26 prominent current and foreign American Jewish communal leaders published a full-page ad in The New York Times with a statement backing the agreement; signers included three former chairs of the Conference of Presidents of Major American Jewish Organizations as well as former AIPAC executive director Tom Dine. Separately, on 17 August 2015 a group of 340 rabbis organized by Ameinu wrote an open letter to Congress in support of the agreement, saying: "We, along with many other Jewish leaders, fully support this historic nuclear accord." The signers were mostly Reform rabbis but included at least 50 rabbis from the Conservative movement and at least one Orthodox rabbi. Prominent rabbis who signed this letter included Sharon Brous, Burton Visotzky, Nina Beth Cardin, Lawrence Kushner, Sharon Kleinbaum, and Amy Eilberg. In a separate letter released on 27 August, 11 Democratic Jewish former members of Congress urged support for the agreement; the letter noted the signatories' pro-Israel credentials and said the agreement "halts the immediate threat of a nuclear-armed Iran" while rejecting it would "put Iran back on the path to develop a nuclear weapon within two to three months". Signatories included former Senator Carl Levin and former Representatives Barney Frank, Mel Levine, Steve Rothman, and Robert Wexler.

Conversely, in late August a group of 900 rabbis signed an open letter by Kalman Topp and Yonah Bookstein calling upon Congress to reject the agreement. The Orthodox Union and American Jewish Committee also announced opposition to the agreement.

The Roman Catholic Church expressed support for the agreement. In a 14 July 2015 letter to Congress, Bishop Oscar Cantú, chairman of the Committee on International Justice and Peace of the United States Conference of Catholic Bishops, wrote that the JCPOA was "a momentous agreement" that "signals progress in global nuclear non-proliferation". Cantú wrote that Catholic bishops in the United States "will continue to urge Congress to endorse the result of these intense negotiations because the alternative leads toward armed conflict, an outcome of profound concern to the Church".

On 25 August 2015 a group of 53 Christian faith leaders from a variety of denominations sent a message to Congress urging them to support the agreement. The Christian leaders wrote: "This is a moment to remember the wisdom of Jesus who proclaimed from the Sermon on the Mount, 'Blessed are the peacemakers, for they shall be called children of God' (Matthew 5:9). ... There is no question we are all better off with this deal than without it." The letter was coordinated by a Quaker group, the Friends Committee on National Legislation. Signatories to the letter included Jim Wallis of Sojourners; John C. Dorhauer, general minister and president of the United Church of Christ; Shane Claiborne; Adam Estle of Evangelicals for Middle East Understanding; Archbishop Vicken Aykazian of the Armenian Orthodox Church; A. Roy Medley, the head of American Baptist Churches USA; the Reverend Paula Clayton Dempsey of the Alliance of Baptists, senior pastor Joel C. Hunter of Northland, A Church Distributed; and Sister Simone Campbell, a leader of the Catholic "Nuns on the Bus" campaigns.

Congressional committee hearings
A hearing on the JCPOA before the Senate Foreign Relations Committee took place on 23 July 2015. Secretary of State Kerry, Treasury Secretary Jack Lew, and Energy Secretary Moniz testified. Republican Senator Bob Corker of Tennessee, the committee chairman, said in his opening statement that when the talks began the goal was to dismantle the Iranian nuclear program, whereas the achieved agreement codified "the industrialization of their nuclear program". Corker, addressing Kerry, said, "I believe you've been fleeced" and "what you've really done here is you have turned Iran from being a pariah to now Congress—Congress being a pariah." Corker said a new threshold in U.S. foreign policy had been crossed and the agreement would "enable a state sponsor of terror to obtain sophisticated, industrial nuclear development program that has, as we know, only one real practical need". The committee's ranking Democratic member, Senator Benjamin Cardin of Maryland, said he had many questions and his hope was that the answers will cause a debate "in Congress and the American people". Democrats, led by Senator Barbara Boxer of California, expressed support for the agreement, with Boxer saying that criticisms by Republicans were "ridiculous", "unfair", and "wrong". Corker and Cardin sent Obama a letter saying the bilateral IAEA-Iran document should be available for Congress to review.

At the hearing Kerry, Lew, and Moniz "were unequivocal in their statements that the accord was the best that could be achieved and that without it, the international sanctions regime would collapse". Kerry warned that the United States would be "on our own" if it walked away from a multilateral agreement alongside the five global powers and added that the belief that "some sort of unicorn arrangement involving Iran's complete capitulation" could be achieved was "a fantasy, plain and simple". The Washington Post reported, "Moniz emerged as the calm center of the proceedings, beginning his interjections with recitations of what he described as 'facts,' and mildly observing that Republican characterizations were 'incorrect.'" Kerry, Lew, and Moniz faced "uniform animus of Republicans" at the hearing, with Republican senators giving "long and often scathing speeches denouncing what they described as a fatally flawed agreement and accusing the administration of dangerous naivete" and showing "little interest in responses" from the three cabinet secretaries. The Washington Post reported on 12 issues related to the agreement over which the two sides disagreed at the hearing.

On 28 July Kerry, Moniz, and Lew testified before the House Committee on Foreign Affairs. Committee chairman Ed Royce, Republican of California, said in his opening statement, "we are being asked to consider an agreement that gives Iran permanent sanctions relief for temporary nuclear restrictions." "Royce also said the inspection regime 'came up short' from 'anywhere, anytime' access to Iran's nuclear facilities and criticized the removal of restrictions on Iran's ballistic missile program and conventional arms." The committee's ranking member, Representative Eliot Engel, Democrat of New York, said he has "serious questions and concerns" about the agreement. Kerry, Lew, and Moniz spent four hours testifying before the committee. At the hearing Kerry said that if Congress killed the deal, "You'll not only be giving Iran a free pass to double the pace of its uranium enrichment, to build a heavy-water reactor, to install new and more efficient centrifuges, but they will do it all without the unprecedented inspection and transparency measures that we have secured. Everything that we have tried to prevent will now happen."

On 29 July Secretary of Defense Ashton Carter, General Martin Dempsey, the chairman of the Joint Chiefs of Staff, Kerry, Moniz, and Lew appeared before the Senate Armed Services Committee in a three-hour hearing. Carter and Dempsey had been invited to testify by Republican Senator John McCain of Arizona, the chairman of the committee; Kerry, Moniz, and Lew attended the hearing at the invitation of the Pentagon. In his opening statement McCain said that if the agreement failed and U.S. armed forces were called to take action against Iran, they "could be at greater risk because of this agreement". He also asserted that the agreement could lead American allies and partners to fateful decisions and result in "growing regional security competition, new arms races, nuclear proliferation, and possibly conflict". The committee's ranking Democratic member, Senator Jack Reed of Rhode Island, said Congress had an obligation "to independently validate that the agreement will meet our common goal of stopping Iran from acquiring a nuclear weapon" and that "the agreement, no matter your position on it, is historic and, if implemented scrupulously, could serve as a strategic inflection point in the world's relations with Iran, for international non-proliferation efforts, and for the political and security dynamics in the Middle East."

Carter said the agreement prevented Iran from "getting a nuclear weapon in a comprehensive and verifiable way". He assured the committee that the deal would not limit the U.S. ability to respond with military force if needed. In response to a question from McCain, Carter said he had "no reason to foresee" that the agreement would cause Iran's threatening behavior to change more broadly, stating "That is why it's important that Iran not have a nuclear weapon." Dempsey offered what he described as a "pragmatic" view. He neither praised nor criticized the deal, but testified that the agreement reduced the chances of a near-term military conflict between the United States and Iran. Dempsey said the agreement worked to keep Iran from developing nuclear weapons but did not address other concerns about Iran's malign activities in the region, ranging from "ballistic missile technology to weapons trafficking, to ... malicious activity in cyberspace". He testified, "Ultimately, time and Iranian behavior will determine if the nuclear agreement is effective and sustainable" and stated that he would continue to provide military options to the president. Senator Joni Ernst expressed disagreement with Obama's statement that the choice was the Iran nuclear deal or war. When Dempsey testified that the United States had "a range of options" he had presented to Obama, Ernst said: "it's imperative everybody on the panel understand that there are other options available."

Under the JCPOA Iran must submit a full report on its nuclear history before it can receive any sanctions relief. The IAEA has confidential technical arrangements with many countries as a matter of standard operating procedure. "Republican lawmakers refer to these agreements as 'secret side deals' and claim that the JCPOA hinges on a set of agreements no one in the administration has actually seen." Senator Tom Cotton of Arkansas, a Republican opponent of the agreement, said that Kerry had "acted like Pontius Pilate" and "washed his hands, kicked it to the IAEA, knowing Congress would not get this information unless someone went out to find it." On 30 July Republican Senator Ted Cruz of Texas introduced a resolution seeking a delay in the review period, arguing, "The 60-calendar day period for review of such agreement in the Senate cannot be considered to have begun until the Majority Leader certifies that all of the materials required to be transmitted under the definition of the term 'agreement' under such Act, including any side agreements with Iran and United States Government-issued guidance materials in relation to Iran, have been transmitted to the Majority Leader." On 5 August, IAEA director general Yukiya Amano spoke with members of the Senate Foreign Relations Committee in a closed briefing about two IAEA documents: an agreement on inspection protocols with Iran and an agreement with Iran regarding Iranian disclosure of its previous nuclear activity (known as Possible Military Dimensions). Following this briefing with Amano, Corker told reporters: "The majority of members here left with far more questions than they had before the meeting took place" and "We can not get him to even confirm that we will have physical access inside of Parchin." Cardin told reporters: "I thought today was helpful, but it was not a substitute for seeing the document."

State Department spokesman John Kirby responded, "There's no secret deals between Iran and the IAEA that the P5+1 has not been briefed on in detail" and stated "These kinds of technical arrangements with the IAEA are a matter of standard practice, that they're not released publicly or to other states, but our experts are familiar and comfortable with the contents, which we would be happy to discuss with Congress in a classified setting." The Center for Arms Control and Non-Proliferation wrote, "The arrangement specifies procedural information regarding how the IAEA will conduct its investigation into Iran's past nuclear history, including mentioning the names of informants who will be interviewed. Releasing this information would place those informants, and the information they hold, at risk." Mark Hibbs of the Nuclear Policy Program at the Carnegie Endowment for International Peace and Thomas Shea, a former IAEA safeguards official and former head of Defense Nuclear Nonproliferation Programs at the Pacific Northwest National Laboratory, wrote that the charges of a "secret side deal" made by opponents of the agreement were a "manufactured controversy". Hibbs and Shea wrote, "The IAEA has safeguards agreement with 180 countries. All have similar information protection provisions. Without these, governments would not open their nuclear programs for multilateral oversight. So IAEA Director General Yukiya Amano was acting by the book on August 5 when he told members of Congress that he couldn't share with them the details of [the] verification protocol the IAEA had negotiated with Iran as part of a bilateral 'roadmap.'" David Albright, founder and president of the Institute for Science and International Security and a former IAEA nuclear inspector, stated that the demands for greater transparency regarding the agreement between Iran and IAEA "aren't unreasonable" and "Iran is a big screamer for more confidentiality. Nonetheless, if the IAEA wanted to make it more open, it could." Albright also proposed that the United States "should clearly and publicly confirm, and Congress should support with legislation, that if Iran does not address the IAEA's concerns about the past military dimensions of its nuclear programs, U.S. sanctions will not be lifted".

Congressional support and opposition
Republican leaders vowed to attempt to kill the agreement as soon as it was released, even before classified sections were made available to Congress, and "Republican lawmakers raced to send out news releases criticizing it." According to The Washington Post, "most congressional Republicans remained deeply skeptical, some openly scornful, of the prospect of relieving economic sanctions while leaving any Iranian uranium-enrichment capability intact." Mitch McConnell said the deal "appears to fall well short of the goal we all thought was trying to be achieved, which was that Iran would not be a nuclear state". A New York Times analysis stated that Republican opposition to the agreement "seems born of genuine distaste for the deal's details, inherent distrust of President Obama, intense loyalty to Israel and an expansive view of the role that sanctions have played beyond preventing Iran's nuclear abilities". The Washington Post identified 12 issues related to the agreement on which the two sides disagreed, including the efficacy of inspections at undeclared sites; the effectiveness of the snapback sanctions; the significance of limits on enrichment; the significance of IAEA side agreements; the effectiveness of inspections of military sites; the consequences of walking away from an agreement; and the effects of lifting sanctions.

One area of disagreement between supporters and opponents of the JCPOA is the consequences of walking away from an agreement, and whether renegotiation of the agreement is a realistic option. Senator Chuck Schumer, Democrat of New York, an opponent of the agreement, called for the U.S. government to keep sanctions in place, strengthen them, and "pursue the hard-trodden path of diplomacy once more, difficult as it may be". Senator Bob Corker, Republican of Tennessee, said that he believed that it was "hyperbole" to say that the agreement was the only alternative to war. President Obama, by contrast, argued that renegotiation of the deal is unrealistic, stating in his American University speech, "the notion that there is a better deal to be had. ... relies on vague promises of toughness" and stated, "Those making this argument are either ignorant of Iranian society, or they are not being straight with the American people. ... Neither the Iranian government, or the Iranian opposition, or the Iranian people would agree to what they would view as a total surrender of their sovereignty." Obama also argued, "those who say we can just walk away from this deal and maintain sanctions are selling a fantasy. Instead of strengthening our position, as some have suggested, Congress' rejection would almost certainly result in multi-lateral sanctions unraveling," because "our closest allies in Europe or in Asia, much less China or Russia, certainly are not going to enforce existing sanctions for another five, 10, 15 years according to the dictates of the U.S. Congress because their willingness to support sanctions in the first place was based on Iran ending its pursuit of nuclear weapons. It was not based on the belief that Iran cannot have peaceful nuclear power." Secretary of State Kerry echoed these remarks, saying in July 2015 that the idea of a "'better deal,' some sort of unicorn arrangement involving Iran's complete capitulation . ... is a fantasy, plain and simple, and our intelligence community will tell you that". Senator Al Franken, Democrat of Minnesota, a supporter of the agreement, wrote: "Some say that, should the Senate reject this agreement, we would be in position to negotiate a "better" one. But I've spoken to representatives of the five nations that helped broker the deal, and they agree that this simply wouldn't be the case."

On 28 July 2015 Representative Sander M. Levin, Democrat of Michigan, the longest-serving Jewish member now in Congress, announced in a lengthy statement that he would support the JCPOA, saying, "the agreement is the best way" to stop Iran from obtaining a nuclear weapon and that a rejection of the agreement would lead the international sanctions regime to "quickly fall apart", as "sanctions likely would not be continued even by our closest allies, and the United States would be isolated trying to enforce our unilateral sanctions as to Iran's banking and oil sectors."

A key figure in the congressional review process is Senator Benjamin Cardin of Maryland, a Democrat who is the ranking member of the Senate Foreign Relations Committee. Cardin took a phone call from Israeli Prime Minister Netanyahu opposing the agreement and participated in a private 90-minute session with Energy Secretary Moniz supporting the agreement. On 21 July Cardin said that if the agreement is implemented, the United States should increase military aid to Israel and friendly Gulf states.

On 4 August 2015 three key and closely watched Senate Democrats—Tim Kaine of Virginia (a Foreign Relations Committee member), Barbara Boxer of California (also a Foreign Relations Committee member), and Bill Nelson of Florida—announced their support for the agreement. In a floor speech that day, Kaine said that the agreement is "far preferable to any other alternative, including war" and, "America has honored its best traditions and shown that patient diplomacy can achieve what isolation and hostility cannot." In a similar floor speech the same day, Nelson said, "I am convinced [that the agreement] will stop Iran from developing a nuclear weapon for at least the next 10 to 15 years. No other available alternative accomplishes this vital objective" and "If the U.S. walks away from this multinational agreement, I believe we would find ourselves alone in the world with little credibility." Conversely, another closely watched senator, Chuck Schumer of New York, who was expected to make a bid to become Senate Democratic leader, announced his opposition to the agreement on 6 August, writing, "there is a strong case that we are better off without an agreement than with one"

According to an Associated Press report, the classified assessment of the United States Intelligence Community on the agreement concludes that because Iran will be required by the agreement to provide international inspectors with "unprecedented volume of information about nearly every aspect of its existing nuclear program", Iran's ability to conceal a covert weapons program will be diminished. In a 13 August letter to colleagues, ten current and former Democratic members of the House Select Committee on Intelligence (including House Minority Leader Nancy Pelosi and Intelligence Committee ranking member Adam Schiff) referred to this assessment as a reason to support the agreement, writing, "We are confident that this monitoring and the highly intrusive inspections provided for in the agreement—along with our own intelligence capabilities—make it nearly impossible for Iran to develop a covert enrichment effort without detection." The ten members also wrote "You need not take our word for it" and referred members to the classified assessment itself, which is located in an office in the Capitol basement and is available for members of Congress to read.

Congressional votes
A resolution of disapproval was initially expected to pass both the House and Senate, meaning, "The real challenge for the White House is whether they can marshal enough Democrats to sustain the veto." Two-thirds of both houses (the House of Representatives and the Senate) are required to override a veto, meaning that one-third of either house (146 votes in the House, or 34 in the Senate) could sustain (uphold) President Obama's veto of a resolution of disapproval.

By early September 2015, 34 senators had publicly confirmed support for the deal, a crucial threshold because it ensured that the Senate could sustain (i. e., uphold) any veto of a resolution of disapproval. Senator Barbara Mikulski of Maryland announced support on 2 September, a day after Chris Coons of Delaware and Bob Casey, Jr., of Pennsylvania also announced support, reaching 34 votes and assuring that an eventual disapproval resolution passed in the Senate could not override an Obama veto. By the following day, 38 Democratic senators supported the deal, 3 were opposed, and 5 were still undecided.

By 8 September, all senators had made a commitment on the agreement, with 42 in support (40 Democrats and two independents) and 58 opposed (54 Republicans and four Democrats). It was possible for senators in support of the agreement to kill the disapproval resolution outright in the Senate by effectively filibustering it, making it unnecessary for Obama to veto a disapproval resolution at all. But this was possible only if at least 41 voted to do so, and several senators in support of the agreement, including Coons, "have suggested they'd prefer an up-or-down vote on the deal, instead of blocking it altogether".

The apparent success of a strategy to marshal congressional support for the deal, linked to a carefully orchestrated rollout of endorsements (although Democratic Senate Whip Dick Durbin and other officials disputed the suggestion of coordination) was attributed to lessons the White House and congressional Democrats learned during struggles in previous summers with Republicans, in particular over Obamacare. An August 2015 meeting at which top diplomats from the UK, Russia, China, Germany, and France told 10 undecided Democratic senators they had no intention of returning to the negotiating table was reported to be particularly crucial. Coons said: "They were clear and strong that we will not join you in re-imposing sanctions."

On 20 August 2015, Pelosi said that House Democrats had the votes to uphold a veto of a resolution of disapproval. To sustain a veto, she would need to hold only 146 of the 188 House Democrats; by 20 August, about 60 House Democrats had publicly declared their support for the final agreement, and about 12 had publicly declared their opposition. In May 2015, before the final agreement was announced, 151 House Democrats signed in support for the broad outlines in the April framework agreement; none of those signatories have announced opposition to the final agreement.

It was originally expected that the House would vote on a formal resolution of disapproval introduced by Representative Ed Royce, Republican of California, the chair of the House Foreign Affairs Committee. As the Senate moved toward a vote on a resolution of disapproval, House leadership (under Republican control) planned to vote on a similar resolution of disapproval. But conservative Republicans "revolted in protest" as "the chamber's right flank wanted tougher action from its leader" and the House Republican leadership (under Speaker John Boehner) planned to vote instead chose to bring a resolution of approval to the floor "as a way to effectively force Democrats who had voiced support for the president to formally register such endorsement". On 11 September 2015 the resolution failed, as expected, on a 162–269 vote; 244 Republicans and 25 Democrats voted no, while 162 Democrats and no Republicans voted yes. On the same day House Republicans held two additional votes, one on a resolution claiming that the Obama administration had failed to meet the requirements of a congressional review period on the deal and another resolution which would prevent the United States from lifting any sanctions. The former resolution passed on a party-line vote, with all Republicans in favor and all Democrats opposed; the latter resolution passed on nearly a party-line vote, with all Republicans and two Democrats in favor, and every other Democrat opposed. The House action against the resolution was a "symbolic vote that will have no consequence for the implementation of the deal", and the two anti-agreement measures passed by the House were seen as "unlikely to even reach Obama's desk".

On 10 September, the day before the vote, Boehner threatened to "use every tool at our disposal to stop, slow, and delay this agreement from being fully implemented", and said that a lawsuit by House Republicans against the president (claiming that the Iran Nuclear Agreement Review Act was not followed) was "an option that is very possible". Four months later House Republicans abandoned their plans for a lawsuit against the administration over the JCPOA.

In July 2015, conservative legal activist Larry Klayman filed a lawsuit against Obama and members of Congress in federal court in West Palm Beach, Florida, asserting that the agreement should be considered a treaty requiring Senate ratification. Klayman's suit was dismissed for lack of standing in September 2015.

Review period in Iran

Iranian Supreme Leader Khamenei issued a letter of guidelines to President Rouhani, ordering him on how to proceed with the deal. On 21 June 2015, the Iranian Parliament (Majlis) decided to form a committee to study the JCPOA and to wait at least 80 days before voting on it. Foreign minister Mohammad Javad Zarif and Atomic Energy Organization of Iran chief Ali Akbar Salehi, defended the deal in Parliament on the same day. Although the Iranian constitution gives Parliament the right to cancel the deal, it was reported that this outcome is unlikely. The New York Times reported, "the legislators have effectively opted to withhold their judgment until they know whether the American Congress approves of the deal."

In televised remarks made on 23 July 2015, Iranian President Hassan Rouhani rejected domestic criticism of the JCPOA from Iranian hardliners, "such as the Islamic Revolutionary Guard Corps and its allies", which "have criticized the accord as an invasive affront to the country's sovereignty and a capitulation to foreign adversaries, particularly the United States". In remarks described by The New York Times as "blunt" and uncharacteristically frank, Rouhani claimed a popular mandate to make an agreement based on his election in 2013 and warned that the alternative was "an economic Stone Age" brought on by sanctions which (as the Times described) have "shriveled oil exports and denied the country access to the global banking system". On 26 July, a two-page, top-secret directive sent to Iranian newspaper editors from Iran's Supreme National Security Council surfaced online. In the document, newspapers are instructed to avoid criticism of the agreement and to avoid giving the impression of "a rift" at the highest levels of government. The BBC reported that the document appears to be aimed at constraining criticism of the JCPOA by Iranian hardliners.

On 3 September, Iranian supreme leader Khamenei said that the Majlis should make the final decision on the agreement. On the same day, Ali Larijani, the speaker of the parliament, said that he supported the agreement and that: "The agreement needs to be discussed and needs to be approved by the Iranian parliament. There will be heated discussions and debates."

Abbas Milani and Michael McFaul wrote: "those [in Iran] supporting the deal include moderates inside the government, many opposition leaders, a majority of Iranian citizens, and many in the Iranian American diaspora—a disparate group that has rarely agreed on anything until now." Within the government, Rouhani and Foreign Minister Javad Zarif, who negotiated the agreement, "are now the most vocal in defending it against Iranian hawks". Also vocally supporting the agreement are former presidents Akbar Hashemi Rafsanjani and Mohammad Khatami and moderates within parliament. The agreement is also supported by most prominent opposition leaders, including Mir-Hossein Mousavi, a 2009 presidential candidate who is under house arrest for his role as a leader of the Green Movement.

Conversely, "the most militantly authoritarian, conservative, and anti-Western leaders and groups within Iran oppose the deal." The anti-agreement coalition in Iran includes former president Mahmoud Ahmadinejad, former head of Atomic Energy Organization of Iran Fereydoon Abbasi, ex-nuclear negotiator Saeed Jalili; and various conservative clerics and Revolutionary Guard commanders. This group has "issued blistering attacks on the incompetence of Iran's negotiating team, claiming that negotiators caved on many key issues and were outmaneuvered by more clever and sinister American diplomats".

Iranian defense minister Hossein Dehqan said on 2 September that Iran would not allow the IAEA to visit every site or facility that it wishes.

The Majlis special commission for examining the JCPOA, has invited Ali Shamkhani, as well as members of former nuclear negotiation team including Ali Bagheri and Fereydoon Abbasi to comment on the deal. During the session, Saeed Jalili, ex-chief negotiator has slammed the deal, stating "approximately 100 absolute rights" of Iran were conceded to the opposing side. He believes the deal is "unacceptable" because Iran makes an "exceptional [nuclear case], replacing 'permission' with 'right' under the NPT, and accepting unconventional measures". He also believes that the deal has crossed the red lines drawn by the Supreme leader of Iran. His testimony was criticized by commission members Masoud Pezeshkian and Abbas Ali Mansouri Arani. In another session, current negotiators Abbas Araqchi and Majid Takht-Ravanchi defended the deal, led by Javad Zarif.

In the Iranian media, the leading reformist newspapers, Etemad and Shargh, "continue to write approvingly of the negotiations and their outcome". Conversely, the leading conservative paper Ettelaat has criticized the agreement. The most "bombastic and hard-line criticism of the deal" has come from Kayhan, which is edited by Hossein Shariatmadari and closely associated with Khamenei, the supreme leader.

The agreement is supported by many Iranian dissidents, including Nobel Peace Prize laureate, human rights activist, and Iranian exile Shirin Ebadi, who "labeled as 'extremists' those who opposed the agreement in Iran and America". Likewise, dissident journalist and former political prisoner Akbar Ganji expressed hope, "step-by-step nuclear accords, the lifting of economic sanctions and the improvement of the relations between Iran and Western powers will gradually remove the warlike and securitized environment from Iran." Citing Iran's human rights situation and the "lack of religious and political freedom in the country", some dissidents opposed the agreement, including Ahmad Batebi, Nazanin Afshin-Jam, and Roozbeh Farahanipour, who signed an open letter arguing, "more pressure should be applied to the regime, not less."

On 13 October The New York Times and many other major U.S. news sources reported that the Iranian Parliament had approved the JCPOA with 161 votes in favor, 59 against and 13 abstentions. Major Iranian news sources including Fars News Agency and Press TV, called a semi-official government source by U.S. media, reported that what was actually approved was a document consisting of the text of the JCPOA supplemented by text unilaterally added by Iran and not agreed to by the P5+1.

Adoption Day
On 18 October 2015 EU High Representative Mogherini and Iranian Foreign Minister Zarif jointly announced "Adoption Day" for the JCPOA, noting actions taken and planned by the EU, Iran, the IAEA, and the United States, and stating, "All sides remain strongly committed to ensuring that implementation of the Joint Comprehensive Plan of Action can start as soon as possible."

On 20 September 2015, Director-General Yukiya Amano of the IAEA went to the Parchin missile production facility, along with Director of Safeguards Tero Varjoranta, to obtain clarifications on the nuclear activities of the site. The next day, Amano professed satisfaction with the samples taken by the Iranians themselves and handed over to the IAEA under "established procedures". IAEA experts were not physically present during the sampling, but Amano said the procedure meets "strict agency criteria" that ensure "the integrity of the sampling process and the authenticity of the samples."  In June 2016, IAEA investigators reported to the Wall Street Journal that they had reported in December 2015 traces of uranium found at the Parchin facility.

Implementation Day

After the IAEA confirmed that Iran met the relevant requirements under the JCPOA, all nuclear sanctions were lifted by the UN, the EU and the United States on 16 January 2016.

Washington imposed new sanctions on 11 companies and individuals for supplying Iran's ballistic missile program on the first day of the implementation. According to Kerry, $1.7 billion in debt with interest was to be paid to Tehran. But some Iranian financial institutions, including Ansar Bank, Bank Saderat, Bank Saderat PLC, and Mehr Bank, remained on the SDN List and a number of U.S. sanctions with respect to Iran, including existing terrorism, human rights and ballistic missiles-related sanctions, remained in place.

Status in U.S. law
In a letter sent to then U.S. Representative Mike Pompeo, the U.S. State Department said that the JCPOA "is not a treaty or an executive agreement, and is not a signed document".

According to the Congressional Research Service, different definitions of "treaty" are used in international law and in domestic U.S. law. According to the Vienna Convention on the Law of Treaties, "The term 'treaty' has a broader meaning under international law than under domestic law. Under international law, 'treaty' refers to any binding international agreement. Under domestic U.S. law, 'treaty' signifies only those binding international agreements that have received the advice and consent of the Senate."

Reactions in U.S. media
Some argue that deterrence is the key to ensuring not just that Iran is in compliance with the agreement but also to preventing them from developing nuclear weapons. Former Assistant Secretary for Nonproliferation Robert Einhorn, a supporter of the agreement, wrote it would be better to have permanent or longer-term restrictions on Iran's enrichment program, but preventing a nuclear-armed Iran is possible, "provided the United States and key partners maintain a strong and credible deterrent against a future Iranian decision to go for the bomb". According to Michael Eisenstadt, Director of the Military and Security Studies Program at the Washington Institute for Near East Policy, "deterring Iran from developing or acquiring nuclear weapons will remain the core imperative driving U.S. policy in the coming years".

Four days after the JCPOA was adopted, Khamenei delivered a speech, highlighting his fatwa and rejecting the claim that the nuclear talks rather than Iran's religious abstinence prevented Iran from acquiring nuclear weapons. He said:

In a letter addressed to Representative Jerrold Nadler, Democrat of New York, President Obama raised the issue about U.S. ability to deter Iran from obtaining nuclear weapons:

Ambassador Dennis Ross, former top Mideast official, and General David Petraeus, former CIA director, wrote in a Washington Post op-ed, "Bolstering deterrence is essential in addressing key vulnerabilities" of the agreement. Petraeus and Ross asserted that if Iran decide to race toward a nuclear weapon "there is a need not to speak of our options but of our readiness to use force", since the threat of force is far more likely to deter the Iranians. They said the president could resolve their concerns by stating that he would use military force to prevent Iran from obtaining a nuclear weapon, including producing highly enriched uranium, even after the deal ends in 15 years. It is "critically important for the president to state this clearly, particularly given his perceived hesitancy to use force", they said.

In the same letter, Obama detailed the possible non-military unilateral and multilateral responses to be employed should Iran violate the agreement, but also wrote, "Ultimately, it is essential that we retain the flexibility to decide what responsive measures we and our allies deem appropriate for any non-compliance." Flexibility meant that Obama rejected specifying "the penalties for smaller violations of the accord" in advance.

Open letter 
The open letter, which was signed by more than 100 former U.S. ambassadors and high-ranking State Department officials endorsing the agreement, begins with the words: "The Joint Comprehensive Plan of Action (JCPOA) with Iran stands as a landmark agreement in deterring the proliferation of nuclear weapons." In contrast, Michael Mandelbaum, the Christian A. Herter Professor at the Johns Hopkins University, School of Advanced International Studies, wrote that nuclear nonproliferation in the Middle East ultimately depended "not on the details of the Vienna agreement but on the familiar Cold-War policy of deterrence". Mandelbaum added that if Obama left office without Iran building the bomb, "the responsibility for conducting a policy of effective deterrence will fall on his successor." Harvard law professor Alan Dershowitz said, "Nothing currently on the table will deter Iran. Sanctions are paper protests to an oil-rich nation. Diplomacy has already failed because Russia and China are playing both sides."

U.S. denies recertification and then withdraws (2017–present)

The United States certified in April 2017 and in July 2017 that Iran was complying with the deal.

On 13 October 2017 President Trump announced that he would not make the certification required under the Iran Nuclear Agreement Review Act, accusing Iran of violating the "spirit" of the deal and calling on the U.S. Congress and international partners to "address the deal's many serious flaws so that the Iranian regime can never threaten the world with nuclear weapons".

Declaring that he would not certify the deal, Trump left it up to Congress whether to reimpose sanctions on Iran and "blow up" the deal. But Trump's aides sought to enact rules indicating how the United States could "reimpose sanctions", and Trump listed three items that could provide such a "trigger" for leaving the deal: Iran's intercontinental ballistic missile, Iranian rejection of "an extension of the deal's existing constraint on its nuclear activities", and "evidence that Iran could manufacture a bomb in less than 12 months". Trump described the deal as "one of the worst and most one-sided transactions the United States has ever entered into".

Iranian President Hassan Rouhani said that getting out from the Iran nuclear deal would "carry a high cost" for the United States, and that no president was allowed to "single-handedly revoke" the deal signed by the UN.

After Trump said that he "cannot and will not" recertify the nuclear deal with Iran, Theresa May, Emmanuel Macron and Angela Merkel supported the deal in a joint statement. Mogherini, the European Union's foreign policy chief, said that the agreement was working well and that no one country could break the deal made by Britain, France, Germany, Russia, China and the European Union. She suggested a "collective process" for keeping the deal. Russia's foreign minister confirmed that Iran was abiding by the deal.

U.S. withdrawal (May 2018)

On 8 May 2018 the United States officially withdrew from the agreement after U.S. President Donald Trump signed a Presidential Memorandum ordering the reinstatement of harsher sanctions. In his 8 May speech President Trump called the Iran deal "horrible" and said the United States would "work with our allies to find a real, comprehensive, and lasting solution" to prevent Iran from developing nuclear arms. The IAEA has continued to assess that Iran has been in compliance with JCPOA and that it had "no credible indications of activities in Iran relevant to the development of a nuclear explosive device after 2009". Other parties to the deal stated that they will work to preserve the deal even after the U.S. withdrawal.

Consequences of U.S. withdrawal

The Iranian currency dropped significantly right after Trump announced the U.S. withdrawal. The U.S. dollar was worth 35,000 rial before U.S. withdrawal and 300,000 in 2021. International banks that chose to trade with Iran during the sanctions paid large fines. Iran's supreme leader, Ayatollah Ali Khamenei, said, "I said from the first day: don't trust America". The American flag was set on fire in Iran's Parliament. According to IDF sources, Iranian Revolutionary Guard Quds Forces based in Syria launched rockets at Israeli military targets the next evening, 9 May. CNN reported that, "if confirmed", it was "the first time Iranian forces have fired rockets directly at Israeli forces."

Ali Khamenei's conditions for Europe to preserve the JCPOA
Following the U.S. withdrawal from JCPOA, Iran supreme leader Ali Khamenei presented seven conditions for Europe to meet its commitments. Among them was that European powers must take steps to preserve business relations with Iranian banks and purchase Iranian oil despite U.S. pressure. He also said there was no need to hold new discussions about Iran's ballistic missile program and regional activities.

Defection of Iran (May 2019 – November 2019)
In May 2019, the IAEA certified that Iran was abiding by the deal's main terms, but questions were raised about how many advanced centrifuges Iran was allowed to have, as that was only loosely defined in the deal.

On 8 May 2019, Iran announced it would suspend implementation of some parts of the JCPOA, threatening further action in 60 days unless it received protection from U.S. sanctions.

On 7 July 2019, Iran announced that it had started to increase uranium enrichment beyond the agreed 3.67% limit. The same day, the IAEA stated its inspectors would verify Iran's announcement. Iranian Foreign Minister Javad Zarif sent a letter to his European counterpart Federica Mogherini notifying her about Iran's noncompliance.

On 4 November 2019, Iran doubled the number of advanced centrifuges it operates. Iran is also enriching uranium to 4.5%; the agreement limits enrichment to 3.67%. On 5 November 2019, Iranian nuclear chief Ali Akbar Salehi announced that Iran will enrich uranium to 5% at the Fordow Fuel Enrichment Plant, adding that it had the capability to enrich uranium to 20% if needed.

Diplomatic conflict (2019–present) 
One year after the United States withdrew from the JCPOA and reimposed several unilateral sanctions on Iran, Iran took countermeasures. As a first step, according to Rouhani, Iran halted sales of excess enriched uranium and heavy water to other countries. Rouhani also said that Iran would resume enrichment of uranium beyond 3.67% if other parties could not fulfill their duties to let Iran benefit from the economic advantages of the JCPOA. Iran made this decision after all major European companies abandoned doing business with Iran out of fear of U.S. punishment.

On 14 May 2019, in a meeting with senior officials, Iran's Supreme Leader, Ali Khamenei, described negotiations with the United States on another nuclear deal as "poison" and said, "We don't seek a war, and they don't either. They know it's not in their interests".

In 2020, Trump and Pompeo asserted that the U.S. remained a "participant" in the agreement, despite having formally withdrawn in 2018, in an effort to persuade the United Nations Security Council to reimpose pre-agreement sanctions on Iran for its breaches of the deal after the United States' withdrawal. The agreement provided for a resolution process among signatories in the event of a breach, but that process had not yet played out.

Speaking about the U.S. desire to restore UN sanctions against Iran and extend an embargo to arms sales to it in 2020, U.S. Ambassador to the United Nations Kelly Craft said: "History is replete of tragedies of appeasing regimes such as this one, that for decades have kept its own people under its thumb. The Trump administration has no fear in standing in limited company on this matter, in light of the unmistakable truth guiding our actions. I only regret that other members of this [Security Council] have lost their way, and now find themselves standing in the company of terrorists." She also wrote a letter to the UN Security Council president on September 20, 2020, pressing her point on sanctions. Speaking at the U.S. State Department in September 2020, she said: "As we have in the past, we will stand alone to protect peace and security at all times. We don't need a cheering section to validate our moral compass."

After the Iranian regime's arrest of human rights activist Farhad Meysami, the U.S. State Department supported him in a statement. Meysami then wrote a letter sharply criticizing Pompeo and the Trump administration, writing, "I would much rather spend all my life imprisoned by a group of my oppressive and ignorant compatriots and try to correct their wrongdoing through reformist action, than to spend a second submitting to the shame and disgrace of support from those who did not follow through with their obligations and withdrew from the rational and peaceful Iran Nuclear Deal (JCPOA) against all principles of morality and international law, and re-imposed inhumane sanctions which have thrown millions of my fellow Iranians into poverty".

After Biden was elected president in 2020, he stated his intention to rejoin the Iran deal. Naftali Bennett, who replaced Netanyahu as Israeli Prime Minister, advised against it, saying, "These very days illustrate what the world would look like if a radical Islamic regime acquired a nuclear weapon. That marriage would be a nuclear nightmare for the entire world. The first goal is to stop Iran on its regional aggression and start rolling them back into the box. And the second is to permanently keep Iran away from ever being able to break out the nuclear weapon."

Re-entry negotiations (2021–2022)
In April 2021, talks between the parties to the original agreement took place in Vienna. But due to the election of a new president in Iran, the meetings were put on hold in June 2021. Enrique Mora, EU coordinator for reviving negotiations with Iran, attended the inauguration of the new Iranian president, Ebrahim Raisi, in Tehran in August. Iran sought assurances from the EU that there will be no repetition of the unilateral U.S. withdrawal. On 14 October 2021, Iran and the EU agreed to hold further negotiations in Brussels. Iranian deputy foreign minister Ali Bagheri reiterated Mora's statement that "the EU was ready to collaborate with Iran and the other parties". U.S. Secretary of State Antony Blinken told reporters that he hoped new talks would succeed but stressed that "the runway that we have left to do is getting shorter and shorter".

On 24 October 2021, Russia's ambassador at the United Nations International Atomic Energy Agency in Vienna, Mikhail Ulyanov, called Iran's demand that the U.S. not withdraw from the JCPOA again "logical and justifiable". President Joe Biden had previously refused to give Iran such assurances. A joint statement by the leaders of France, Germany, the U.K., and the U.S. on October 30 welcomed "President Biden's clearly demonstrated commitment to return the U.S. to full compliance with the JCPOA and to stay in full compliance, so long as Iran does the same." Talks resumed in Vienna on 29 November 2021, with representatives from Iran, China, France, Germany, Russia, and the U.K. present.

At the start of the seventh round of negotiations, European, Russian, British, Chinese and Iranian negotiators expressed optimism about reviving the JCPOA. A European diplomat said that in June 2021, 70% to 80% of a draft deal had been agreed upon. Mora said he felt "extremely positive" about what he had seen. Bagheri called everything discussed so far merely a “draft” and presented Iran's own new draft. Western negotiators called Iran's new proposals "unacceptable" and saw little chance of a successful negotiation unless Iran changed its position. Iranian negotiators insisted that the U.S. first lift all sanctions before Iran would scale back its nuclear program, contradicting the previous understanding of "compliance for compliance." On 9 December 2021, negotiations to save the deal continued as Russia and China exerted diplomatic pressure on Iran to revise its stance. According to the Russian ambassador Mikhail Ulyanov, "a number of misunderstandings that created some tension had been eliminated and everyone confirmed their commitment to productive work". The previous week's negotiations had stalled as Iran's draft proposal, demanding the removal of all sanctions, was unacceptable to European negotiators.

On 20 February 2022, 250 members of the 290-member Iranian parliament, which has been controlled by conservatives and hardliners since 2020, issued a statement urging Raisi to comply with their requirements in reviving the JCPOA.

In early March 2022, a senior official and spokesperson for the State Department said, "the parties are close to a possible deal but a number of very difficult issues remain unsolved". The U.S. is engaged in indirect talks with Iran in Vienna, mediated by China, Russia and European parties of the original agreement. Revival of the JCPOA became a priority for the Biden administration when the war in Ukraine further affected global energy prices. About a million barrels of Iranian oil each day could be added to the international market, which would have a significant impact on crude oil prices and reduce the threat of nuclear war in the region.

On 5 March 2022, Iran claimed it had reached an agreement with the IAEA to resolve all outstanding doubts about undeclared materials from three nuclear sites by late June. IAEA chief Rafael Grossi, who visited Iran in early March, is to present those findings to the governing body by July. Russian demands to explicitly protect its economic relations with Iran have been identified as a potential stumbling block for the U.S. administration. Later, Russia received guarantees from the U.S. to protect its trade relations with Iran from Western sanctions. Visiting Iran in late March, Mora attempted to resolve remaining differences. Meanwhile, Iran confirmed the removal of its Islamic Revolutionary Guard Corps (IRGC) from a U.S. terror blacklist to be another issue in the negotiations. On 26 March 2022, European Union foreign policy chief Josep Borrell told a forum in Doha that the restoration of the Iran nuclear agreement was expected in "a matter of days", but that "political decisions" were required from Tehran and Washington.

By May 2022, talks to revive the JCPOA had completely stalled, as Republicans in the U.S. Congress pushed the Biden administration away from negotiations with Iran. On 7 May 2022, Mora again visited Iran to restart the talks amid a breakdown in communications among the parties to the agreement.

Iran has demanded that the U.S. delist the IRGC from its terror blacklist in exchange for reviving the JCPOA. (Former President Trump added the IRGC to the blacklist after withdrawing from the JCPOA.) The Biden administration has replied that the original deal did not involve this listing and that the two matters are "separate", and that if Iran wants sanctions relief beyond the original deal, it will have to make commitments beyond the original deal. On 24 April 2022, after a phone call with Israeli Prime Minister Naftali Bennett, Biden decided to keep the IRGC on the U.S. terror blacklist, with the backing of a bipartisan majority of U.S. senators. In a contradictory statement, Iran Foreign Minister Hossein Amir-Abdollahian said on 26 May 2022 that the blacklisting of the IRGC was "not significant" and that it was not the "main hurdle". In June 2022 Tehran said that it was removing 27 tamper-proof surveillance cameras that had been installed by experts at the UN atomic watchdog. Rafael Grossi said the move could be a “fatal blow” to nuclear deal negotiations. On 16 June, the Biden administration announced new sanctions against Iran's petrochemical industry, in an effort to persuade Iran to return to the JCPOA. In a 5 July interview, U.S. Special Envoy for Iran Robert Malley said that Iranian negotiators had added demands, such as the delisting of the IRGC, that were outside the scope of the JCPOA. Iran insists the blacklisting of the IRGC was a unilateral U.S. action under Trump after the agreement was annulled.

On 6 July 2022, the U.S. announced another round of sanctions targeting the Iranian petrochemical industry, while initiating new legal proceedings against entities based in Singapore, Vietnam and the United Arab Emirates. The new sanctions were announced just days after a round of indirect talks between the U.S. and Iran in Qatar. Biden and his team have expressed their commitment to reviving the deal through mutual compliance, but the U.S. has tightened sanctions against Iran since Trump unilaterally withdrew from the agreement. While EU officials have shown continued interest to negotiate a "strong and durable" agreement, U.S. officials have warned that the window for achieving a meaningful deal is closing as "Tehran acquires nuclear expertise irreversibly".

After indirect talks between the U.S. and Iran in Doha in late June again yielded no results, British sources expressed skepticism that Iran's Supreme Leader Ayatollah Ali Khamenei actually wanted to revive a nuclear deal with world powers. Iran accused French, British and U.S. diplomats of stalling the agreement. At the same time, Iran grew more critical of Rafael Grossi, head of the International Atomic Energy Agency (IAEA), calling his comments "politically motivated". But Iranian Foreign Ministry spokesman Nasser Kanaani said in a late July press release that Iran is "definitely thinking about an agreement". According to Iran's foreign ministry, the accord's finalization hinges on a political decision by the United States.

In August 2022, Iran demanded closure of a multiyear probe by the International Atomic Energy Agency (IAEA) over man-made nuclear material found in Iran as a condition for restoring the JCPOA. Later that month, European negotiators presented a "final" text for the U.S. and Iran to consider, after another round of discussions the week before. Iranian officials met the new draft with "guarded optimism“, which significantly increased the chance that the nuclear deal would be revived. According to the Iranian side, the new draft has "substantially evolved", with significant improvements from its previous versions. The August draft did not include Tehran's demand that the U.S. lift the IRGC's terrorism designation, according to a senior U.S. official, who also claimed that Iran dropped its call for the IAEA to end the investigation into traces of uranium at three undeclared sites.

On September 2, 2022, Iran's Foreign Ministry said it had sent a "constructive" response to U.S. proposals to revive the JCPOA, but the U.S. State Department said the response was not constructive. According to EU's chief negotiator Josep Borrell, the parties had initially issued a series of "reasonable requests" to the European draft deal, when Iran agreed to no longer demand the delisting of the IRGC. Iran still insisted on more guarantees for any future, unilateral withdrawals from the current agreement. Later Borrell stated that after a convergence in the negotiations, a divergence was now obvious, and the process was "in danger". Likely the remaining disagreement between Iran and the U.S. involve pertinent enforcement actions by the IAEA to limit Tehran's nuclear programme.

On September 10, France, Britain, and Germany released a statement that they had "serious doubts as to Iran's intentions and commitment to a successful outcome on the JCPoA", prompting Iran's Foreign Ministry to say the statement was "unconstructive" and taking the "Zionist path". Russia’s envoy to the negotiations called the European reaction “very untimely indeed”, and said the remaining issue "was not a serious obstacle". Nevertheless, hopes for an Iran deal faded, and the price of WTI crude increased by 2%. Moreover, Iran has increased its oil exports to China with favorable prices, circumventing economic sanctions. On September 16, during an interview before his talk at the United Nations, Ebrahim Raisi said that despite the claim that the Biden administration is different from the Trump administration, "we haven’t witnessed any changes in reality.” Shortly after, France's foreign minister said, "there is no better offer for Iran" on the table.

On October 12, at a news conference in Washington, U.S. State Department spokesperson Ned Price said that reviving the JCPOA is "not our focus right now" and that the U.S. was concentrating on how to support Iranian protesters in their peaceful demonstrations.

On October 17, former U.S. diplomat Richard N. Haass wrote on Twitter, "Iran’s support for Russia & crackdown on protests has ended any chance the U.S. will rejoin the JCPOA anytime soon if ever as it would throw an economic lifeline to a repressive and aggressive regime that could well be on the ropes".

On 31 October 2022, Iran Special Envoy Robert Malley said that the U.S. still supports restoring the JCPOA, but that talks were not the focus at the time, saying, "We are not going to waste our time on it" because "nothing is happening" on that matter, though "from a nonproliferation perspective the U.S. cannot afford to wait for much longer for Iran to moderate its demands over the IAEA investigation or to see how the current protests play out". In November 2022, Italy's Foreign Minister Antonio Tajani, addressing the issue of the ongoing EU-mediated talks to revive the JCPOA, struck a more positive tone, saying that Europe should "do its utmost" to revive the nuclear deal. Iranian Foreign Ministry spokesman Nasser Kanaani said in October that the U.S. and Europe are linking the negotiations on the JCPOA to “recent issues in Iran” that involve Iran's "internal affairs".

On 15 December 2022, it was announced the International Atomic Energy Agency (IAEA) would send a delegation to Tehran on 18 December 2022 to clarify outstanding issues with regard to nuclear material discovered at three sites. According to the report, the Islamic Republic News Agency (IRNA) cited Mohammad Eslami, head of the Atomic Energy Organization of Iran, as saying that this interaction would hopefully remove obstacles and ambiguities. Earlier Iran reported it had enriched uranium to its highest level of 60%, one step away from weapons grade. IAEA Director General Grossi confirmed the invitation by Tehran, where a technical team would address outstanding safeguard issues. Despite political unrest in Iran after the death of a young Kurdish woman in police custody in September 2022, and additional sanctions on Iranian entities, "the definitive death of the JCPOA is not a foregone conclusion", according to Near East Policy experts, assuming Tehran abandons its position on IAEA probes. Iran also participates in the Nuclear Nonproliferation Treaty, which implements safeguards for fissionable materials in all peaceful nuclear activities.

On 20 December 2022, a meeting was held in Amman, Jordan, to further discuss details of a possible deal. Josep Borrell noted the bloc did "not have a better option than the JCPOA to ensure that Iran does not develop nuclear weapons". According to the Iranian foreign ministry, Hossein Amirabdollahian said the talks are "based on a draft that is a result of months of difficult and intensive negotiations".

On 29 December 2022, Russian Foreign Minister Sergey Lavrov said in an interview with Russian media that the JCPOA had "no reasonable alternative", and that the transition to Plan B will lead to "escalation, an arms race, open conflict with irreversible consequences." Politico reported that IAEA Director Rafael Grossi would again visit Iran in January 2023 for further discussions of Iran's nuclear program and cooperation with the agency, according to two European diplomats. Earlier Iranian Foreign Minister Hossein Amir-Abdollahian commented during a meeting with Oman's Sultan Haitham bin Tariq in Muscat that Iran is still open to negotiations to revive a nuclear deal.

In early February 2023, Director General of the IAEA Rafael Grossi warned against "a defeatist approach to the signatories' sluggish efforts to revive the JCPOA". He asserted his strictly non-political role and stressed that an alternative to the 2015 nuclear deal might be another way forward. Grossi was criticised for giving the international community a false sense of security by saying Iran does not have nuclear weapons. The IAEA report on the Fordow Fuel Enrichment Plant, a sensitive Iranian uranium enrichment site, found that two cascades of IR-6 centrifuges were configured in a way "substantially different" from what Iran had previously declared. Iran had claimed the difference was due to a human error. On 31 January 2023, the US State Department authorized a waiver to the sanctions, which allows Russia to develop the profitable enrichment site, a move that some criticised because it allows Iran to develop its nuclear program with Russian-state controlled firms. Earlier Grossi had denied suggestions that Russia's growing alliance with Iran could somehow block the IAEA’s work to monitor Iran's nuclear programme. A visit by the IAEA chief to Tehran is scheduled for February 2023 to continue the negotiations.

On 4 March 2023, IAEA Director General Rafael Mariano Grossi met with Iranian President Ebrahim Raisi and other top officials in Tehran. Earlier the IAEA detected uranium particles enriched up to 83.7% at the underground Fordo site. In the meantime, Iran had given assurances that it would reinstall monitoring equipment at a number of sensitive locations, a move viewed as a vast improvement after years of stonewalling on the issue. A recent IAEA report said, "Iran expressed its readiness to ... provide further information and access to address the outstanding safeguards issues". Grossi later said he "looks forward to ... prompt and full implementation of the Joint Statement". The IAEA censored Iran twice in 2022 for failing to cooperate.

See also

 2016 U.S.–Iran naval incident
 Begin Doctrine (The common term for the Israeli government's preventive strike to the potential enemies' capability to possess WMD)
 Black Cube (a private intelligence company founded by former Israeli intelligence officers)
 United States national emergency with respect to Iran
 The UNSC and the United States resolutions on the Iran Arms
 Nuclear proliferation
 Agreed Framework
 Budapest Memorandum
 Disarmament of Iraq
 Disarmament of Libya

Notes

References

External links

 "Joint statement by EU High Representative Federica Mogherini and Iranian Foreign Minister Javad Zarif" at the European External Action Service (EEAS)
 Full text of the agreement:
 Via EEAS:
 "Joint Comprehensive Plan of Action"
 "Annex I: Nuclear-related commitments"
 "Annex II: Sanctions-related commitments"
 "Attachments to Annex II"
 "Annex III: Civil nuclear cooperation"
 "Annex IV: Joint Commission"
 "Annex V: Implementation Plan"
 

 Videos
Inside the Iran Nuclear Deal with the Lead U.S. Negotiator (2015) - Miller Center
 On The Same Page: America's Middle East Allies and Regional Threats - Foundation for Defense of Democracies — 1/15/2021
 UAE Minister of State Yousef Al Otaiba
 Bahrain Ambassador to U.S. Rashid al-Khalifa
 Israel Ambassador to U.S. Ron Dermer
 Iran Nuclear Deal Progress Report –  Nuclear Threat Initiative (2017)
 "The Iran Nuclear Deal Explained" – The Wall Street Journal (2015)

2015 documents
2010s in Vienna
2015 in Austria
2015 in international relations
2015 in Iran
2016 in Iran
2015 controversies
2016 controversies
July 2015 events in Europe
Agreements
Diplomatic conferences in Austria
Presidency of Barack Obama
Obama administration controversies
Presidency of Hassan Rouhani
John Kerry
Middle East peace efforts
Nuclear energy in Iran
Nuclear program of Iran
Nuclear weapons policy
Foreign relations of Iran
Foreign relations of China
Iran–United States relations
China–Iran relations
France–Iran relations
Germany–Iran relations
Iran–Russia relations
Iran–Oman relations
Iran–United Kingdom relations
Oman–United States relations
United States–European Union relations
China–European Union relations
Iran–European Union relations
Russia–European Union relations
China–United States relations
France–United States relations
Germany–United States relations
Russia–United States relations
United Kingdom–United States relations